The 2003 Queen's Birthday Honours were announced on 14 June 2003 for the United Kingdom and on 2 June 2003 for New Zealand.

The recipients of honours are displayed here as they were styled before their new honour.

United Kingdom

Knight Bachelor
Kenneth Hugo Adam, O.B.E. For services to film production design and to UK-German relations.
Martyn Arbib, D.L. For services to Charities, especially Education.
Professor John Hamilton Baker, Q.C., Downing Professor of the Laws of England, University of Cambridge. For services to English Legal History.
Professor Patrick Bateson, F.R.S., Professor of Ethology, University of Cambridge. For services to Science.
Professor Sushantha Kumar Bhattacharyya, C.B.E., Director, Warwick Manufacturing Group, University of Warwick. For services to Higher Education and Industry.
Ian Warwick Blair, Q.P.M., Deputy Commissioner, Metropolitan Police Service. For services to the Police.
Kenneth Darlingston Collins, Chairman, Scottish Environment Protection Agency. For services to Environmental Protection.
Andrew Duncan Crockett, lately Chairman, Financial Stability Forum and General Manager, Bank for International Settlements. For services to International Finance.
Michael John Austin Cummins, Serjeant-At-Arms, House of Commons.
Professor Richard Henry Friend, F.R.S., Cavendish Professor of Physics, University of Cambridge. For services to Physics.
John Christopher Gains, Group Chief Executive, John Mowlem & Co. plc. For services to the Construction Industry.
Arthur Benjamin Norman Gill, C.B.E., President, National Farmers’ Union. For services to Agriculture, Conservation and the Community.
Michael Stewart Hodgkinson, Group Chief Executive, BAA plc. For services to the Air Travel Industry.
John Anthony Holland, Chairman, Parades Commission for Northern Ireland.
Dr Alistair Allan Horne, C.B.E., Historian. For services to UK-French relations.
Peter Lampl, O.B.E., Chairman, Sutton Trust. For services to Higher Education.
Francis Henry MacKay, Chairman, Compass Group. For services to the Hospitality Industry and Charity.
Robin Robert William Miller, lately Chief Executive, EMAP. For services to Publishing and Broadcasting.
William Morris, General Secretary, Transport and General Workers Union. For services to Trade Unions.
Charles Kenneth Roylance Nunneley, lately Chairman, National Trust. For services to Heritage.
Christopher John O’Donnell, Chief Executive, Smith & Nephew plc. For services to the Medical Devices Industry Worldwide.
Dr John Oldham, O.B.E. For services to the NHS.
Christopher Ondaatje, C.B.E., Philanthropist and Benefactor. For charitable services to Museums, Galleries and Societies.
John Reginald Rowling, Headteacher, Nunthorpe School, Middlesbrough. For services to Education.
Dr Kenneth Robinson, Academic writer and speaker. For services to art.
Professor Edwin Mellor Southern, F.R.S., Whitley Professor of Biochemistry, University of Oxford. For services to the Development of DNA Microarray Technologies.
William George Taylor, Leader, Blackburn with Darwen Borough Council. For services to Local Government.
Professor John Graham Temple. For services to Medicine and Medical Education.
John Tusa, Managing Director, Barbican Centre. For services to the Arts.

Order of the Bath

Knight Commander of the Order of the Bath (KCB)
Military Division
Admiral Ian Andrew Forbes, C.B.E.

Civil Division
Brian Geoffrey Bender, C.B., Permanent Secretary, Department for Environment, Food and Rural Affairs.
Richard John Broadbent, Chairman, H.M. Customs and Excise.

Companion of the Order of the Bath (CB)
Military Division
Rear Admiral Alexander Kirkwood Backus, O.B.E.
Rear Admiral Jonathon Reeve.
Air Vice-Marshal Phillip Wycliffe Roser, M.B.E., Royal Air Force.
Air Vice-Marshal Andrew George Buchanan Vallance, O.B.E., Royal Air Force.

Civil Division
Catherine Elisabeth Dorcas, Mrs Bell, Director General, Services Group, Department of Trade and Industry.
Terrance Dennis Byrne, Director General, Law Enforcement, H.M. Customs and Excise.
George Cubie, Clerk of Committees, House of Commons.
John Michael Dowdall. For public service.
John Gant, Director of Finance, Inland Revenue.
Roy Jason Griffins, Director, Aviation Directorate, Department for Transport.
Stephen Geoffrey Hewitt, Business Design Director, Department for Work and Pensions.
Gordon Hextall, Chief Operating Officer, Programme and Systems Delivery, Department for Work and Pensions.
Christopher Stephen Kerse, Second Counsel to the Chairman of Committees and Legal Adviser to the European Union Committee, House of Lords.
John MacDonald Lyon, lately Director General, Policing and Crime Reduction Group, Home Office.
Hugh Finlay MacDiarmid, Solicitor to the Advocate General for Scotland.
Clive Murray Norris, Director, Fire, Health and Safety Directorate, Office of the Deputy Prime Minister.
Stephen Wentworth, Fisheries Director, Department for Environment, Food and Rural Affairs.

Order of St Michael and St George

Knight Grand Cross of the Order of St Michael and St George (GCMG)
Sir John Robertson Young, K.C.M.G., British High Commissioner, New Delhi.

Knight Commander of the Order of St Michael and St George (KCMG)
John Frederick Mogg, lately Director-General Internal Markets and Financial Services, European Commission.
Peter John Westmacott, C.M.G., L.V.O., H.M. Ambassador, Ankara.

Companion of the Order of St Michael and St George (CMG)
Richard Harding Alford, O.B.E., Director Italy, British Council.
Andrew Robert Fowell Buxton. For services to UK trade.
Judge Ian Burns Campbell, lately Deputy High Representative for Legal Affairs, Bosnia and Herzegovina.
Bruce Harry Dinwiddy, Governor, Cayman Islands.
Dr Carol Dow, Chief Medical Adviser, Foreign and Commonwealth Office.
Edward Charles Glover, M.V.O., lately British High Commissioner, Georgetown.
Air Vice-Marshal Hubert Desmond Hall, C.B., C.B.E., A.F.C. For services to UK-Australia relations.
Nigel Norman Inkster, Counsellor, Foreign and Commonwealth Office.
Michael Kirkwood, Chairman, American Financial Services Association. For services to the city and to the US Financial Community in the UK.
Brigadier Graeme Cameron Maxwell Lamb, O.B.E., late The Queen's Own Highlanders.
Professor Michael Lipton, Founding Director, Poverty Research Unit, University of Sussex. For services to International Development.
John MacCalman (Ian) Little, C.B.E., lately member of the UK delegation to the European Economic and Social Committee and President of its Employers Group.
Dr Rosalind Mary Marsden, Director Asia-Pacific, Foreign and Commonwealth Office.
John Michael Scott, lately Head, Rural Livelihoods Department, Department for International Development.
Percival Edward Tarling, Deputy Director-General, General Secretariat, Council of the European Union.

Royal Victorian Order

Knight Commander of the Royal Victorian Order (KCVO)
Timothy Gerald Martin Brooks, formerly Lord Lieutenant of Leicestershire.
Brigadier Miles Garth Hunt-Davis, C.V.O., C.B.E., Private Secretary to The Duke of Edinburgh.
Dr Richard Paul Hepworth Thompson, Head of The Queen's Medical Household and Physician to The Queen.

Commander of the Royal Victorian Order (CVO)
The Honourable Ronald Joseph Arculli, O.B.E., Chairman, The Duke of Edinburgh's Award, International Association.
Major Nicholas Michael Lancelot Barne, L.V.O., Comptroller, Equerry and Private Secretary to The Duke and Duchess of Gloucester.
Martin Charles Brian Bonsey, L.V.O., formerly Official Secretary, Government House, Canberra.
Dr Andrew Louis Hamilton Gailey, House Master, Eton College.
Sir Peter Harold Reginald Marshall, K.C.M.G., formerly Chairman, Joint Commonwealth Societies’ Council.
Mary, Lady Carew Pole, L.V.O., Lady in Waiting to The Princess Royal.
Kenneth Robert Williams, Q.P.M. For services to the Norfolk Constabulary.

Lieutenant of the Royal Victorian Order (LVO)
Helen Andrea Louise, Mrs Cross, M.V.O., Secretary to the Private Secretary to The Queen.
Richard Francis Dobb, Secretary, Corporation of Trinity House.
Roger Martin Eldridge, Managing Director, Camera Press Limited.
Colonel David Valentine Fanshawe, O.B.E., Lieutenant, Her Majesty's Body Guard of the Honourable Corps of Gentlemen at Arms.
Miss Charlotte Elizabeth Manley, O.B.E., Private Secretary and Treasurer to The Duke of York.
Jonathan Mark Marsden, Deputy Surveyor of The Queen's Works of Art.
Terence John Regan. For services to The Duke of Edinburgh's Award.
John Garrett Speirs, C.B.E., formerly Chairman, UK Faculty, The Prince of Wales's Business and the Environment Programme.
Colin David Tweedy, O.B.E., Chief Executive, Arts and Business.

Member of the Royal Victorian Order (MVO)
Kenneth John Appleby, Senior Property Officer, St James's Palace.
Nigel Marcus Baker, formerly Assistant Private Secretary to The Prince of Wales.
Stephen Harvey Caldwell, formerly Senior Property Officer, Windsor Castle.
Major (Matthew) Munro Davidson, M.B.E., B.E.M., Superintendent, Windsor Castle.
Gillian Mary, Mrs Frampton, Nursing Sister, Windsor Castle.
David Moffat, formerly Director of Private Clients, Aon Limited.
Jeremy George Pontin, formerly Land Steward, Isles of Scilly, Duchy of Cornwall.
Richard Anthony Skinner, formerly Director of Bentley and Skinner.
Malcolm Richard Slater, Sales Manager, Bentley Mulliner.
Warrant Officer Class 1 Brian Howard Michael Smith, M.B.E., M.S.M., Superintending Clerk, Household Division.
Frederick George Stickler, Chief Forestry Officer, Crown Estate.
Caroline Francesca, Mrs Todhunter, formerly Queen Elizabeth The Queen Mother's Representative, Queen Mary's Clothing Guild.

Royal Victorian Medal

Royal Victorian Medal (Gold)
Anthony Vernon Parnell, R.V.M., Foreman, Sandringham House.
Ashley John Sadler, R.V.M., Mechanic, Sandringham Estate.

Bar to the Royal Victorian Medal (Silver)
Robert John Pine, R.V.M., Pastry Sous Chef, Royal Household.

Royal Victorian Medal (Silver)
Michael Norman Back, Assistant Manager, Public Enterprises, Sandringham Estate.
Constable Charles Clement Collings, Royalty and Diplomatic Protection, Metropolitan Police.
Stephen Allan Grassick, Joiner, Balmoral Estate.
Constable Ronald James Hayward, Royalty and Diplomatic Protection, Metropolitan Police.
Christopher David Hillyard, Special Vehicles Manager, Alstom Transport.
Frederick Arthur Ind, Estate Worker, Highgrove Estate.
Raymond Frederick Keates, Painter and Decorator, Crown Estate, Windsor.
Mark Geoffrey Lisk, Gardener, Sunninghill Park.
Charles George Lockyer, Telephone Engineer, Royal Household.
John Henry Melton, Tractor Driver, Sandringham Country Park.
Colin Missenden, formerly Divisional Sergeant Major, The Queen's Body Guard of the Yeomen of the Guard.
Keith Thomas Parker, Warden, Windsor Castle.
Ivor Benjamin Reeves, Part-time Security Officer, Eton College.
Roy John Reeves, Gardener, Crown Estate, Windsor.
Arthur Malcolm Smith, Chef de Partie, Royal Household.
Wayne Laurence Sutton, Chauffeur to the Governor of Tasmania.
Constable Russell Wood, Royalty and Diplomatic Protection, Metropolitan Police.

Order of the Companions of Honour (CH)
David Hugh Alexander, Baron Hannay of Chiswick, G.C.M.G., lately UK Special Representative for Cyprus.
Sir (Alan) Charles (MacLaurin) Mackerras, C.B.E., Composer and Conductor. For services to Music.
Professor Dan Peter McKenzie, F.R.S., Royal Society Research Professor, Department of Earth Sciences, University of Cambridge. For services to Science.

Order of the British Empire

Dame Commander of the Order of the British Empire (DBE)
Miss Elizabeth Violet Blackadder, O.B.E., Painter. For services to the Visual Arts.
Ms Yvonne Helen Elaine Buckland, Chair, Health Development Agency. For services to Public Health.
Ms Pamela Sarah Coward, Headteacher, Middleton Technology College, Rochdale. For services to Education.
Dr (Valerie) Jane Goodall, C.B.E. For services to the environment and conservation.
Ms Helen Mirren, Actress. For services to Drama.
Professor Julia Margaret Polak, Head, Tissue Engineering and Regenerative Medicine Centre, Imperial College, London. For services to Medicine.
Miss Ruth Laura Robins, Headteacher, JFS School, Brent, London. For services to Education.
Anita Lucia, Mrs Roddick, O.B.E., Founder of The Body Shop. For services to Retailing, the Environment and Charity.

Knight Commander of the Order of the British Empire (KBE)
Lieutenant General Cedric Norman George Delves, C.B.E., D.S.O., late The Devonshire and Dorset Regiment.
Roger George Moore, C.B.E. For charitable services, especially to UNICEF and Kiwanis International.
The Honourable Michael Aidan Pakenham, C.M.G., H.M. Ambassador, Warsaw.

Commander of the Order of the British Empire (CBE)
Military Division
 Commodore Peter John Lannin. Royal Fleet Auxiliary.
 Commodore Julian Llewelyn Williams. Royal Navy.
 Air Commodore Kevin James Leeson. Royal Air Force.
 Air Commodore Nigel Richard Wood. Royal Air Force.
 Brigadier Tweedie McGarth Brown, OBE. Late Corps of Royal Engineers.
 Brigadier Shaun Philip Cowlam, MBE. Late The Royal Logistic Corps.
 Brigadier Andrew Peter Farquhar, MBE. Late The Green Howards.
 Colonel Simon Leslie Porter. Late The Royal Anglian Regiment.
 Colonel Ian Robert Sinclair. Late Royal Regiment of Artillery.
 Major-General Graham Gerald Messervy-Whiting, MBE. Late Intelligence Corps.
Civilian Division
 Christopher Nigel Banks. Chair, Learning and Skills Council's Young People's Learning Committee and Chair, London Employers' Coalition. For services to Young People and the Unemployed.
 John Bartle. For services to Advertising, Charity and Education.
 Simon Russell Beale, Actor. For services to Drama.
 Edward Geoffrey Beardsall, Director, Business Development and Deputy chief executive, HM Land Registry, Lord Chancellor's Department.
 Robert Beckham, Director, Intellectual Property Rights, Defence Procurement Agency, Ministry of Defence.
 Marcus de la Poer Beresford, Lately Chief Executive, GKN plc. For services to the Engineering Industry Worldwide.
 Ms Christina Ann Bienkowska, Divisional Manager, Strategy and Performance Division, Department for Education and Skills. 
 Mrs Margaret Janet Bloom, Director, Competition Enforcement, Office of Fair Trading.
 Dr Ian Gibb Bogle, Chair of Council, British Medical Association. For services to Medicine.
 Derek Arnold Boothman, Non-Executive Director, Remploy. For services to Disabled People and to the Accounting Profession.
 Christopher Paul Brearley, Director, Methodology and Information, Social Services Inspectorate, Department of Health.
 Mrs Mary Teresa Breslin, Lately Managing Partner, Total Engineering. For services to Business and to the community in Londonderry.
 Richard David Briers, OBE, Actor. For services to Drama.
 Alan Britten. Lately Chair, English Tourism Council.
 Andrew Gibson Brown, QPM, Chief Constable, Grampian Police. For services to the Police.
 James Thomas Brown, Head, Public Health Division, Health Department, Scottish Executive.
 George Brumwell, General Secretary, Union of Construction, Allied Trades and Technicians and Member, Health and Safety Commission. For services to the Construction Industry.
 Thomas William Cain, QC. Lately First Deemster, For services to the Administration of Justice in the Isle of Man.
 Andrew Robertson Campbell, OBE, JP, DL, Convenor, Dumfries and Galloway Council. For services to Local Government and to Agriculture.
 Miss Susan Catherine Campbell, MBE, Chief Executive, Youth Sports Trust. For services to Sport.
 Mrs Anthea Fiendley Case,. Director, National Heritage Memorial Fund. For services to Heritage.
 Alan Herbert Cherry, MBE, DL, Chairman, Countryside Properties plc and Greenwich Millennium Village Ltd. For services to Urban Regeneration and the Housebuilding Industry.
 Commander David Julian Childs, Founder, National Memorial Arboretum.
 Richard John Clayton, Assistant Legal Adviser, Home Office.
 William Connolly, Actor and Comedian. For services to Entertainment.
 Anthony Cooper, Headteacher, Aldercar Community College, Derbyshire. For services to Education.
 Professor Joseph Mordaunt Crook. For services to Architectural History.
 James Roderick Alexander Cumming, Chief Executive, Highlands and Islands Enterprise. For services to Economic Development.
 Ms Monica Darnbrough, Director, Bioscience Unit, Department of Trade and Industry.
 Ian Frederic Hay Davison. For charitable services, especially to the Arts. 
 Mike Deegan, Chief Executive, Central Manchester and Manchester Children's University Hospitals NHS Trust. For services to the NHS.
 Andrew Dillon, Chief Executive, National Institute for Clinical Excellence.
 Mrs Elizabeth Eccles, Head of Resource Allocation, Department of Health.
 David Albert Edmonds, Director General of Telecommunications, OFTEL.
 Professor Kay-Tee Khaw-Fawcett, Professor of Clinical Gerontology, University of Cambridge. For services to Medicine.
 Iain George Thomas Ferguson, Chief Executive, Tate and Lyle plc. For services to the Food Industry.
 Simon Joseph Fraser, Founder Chairman, Fibrowatt Ltd. For services to the Renewable Energy Industry.
 Mrs Adrienne Sheila Fresko, Deputy Chair, Audit Commission. For services to Local Government and to the Health Service.
 William Leslie Gardner, Lately Chief Veterinary Officer, Scotland, Department for Environment, Food and Rural Affairs.
 Mrs Helen Mary Gilchrist, Principal, Bury College. For services to Further Education.
 Alan Raymond Gillespie. For services to the Northern Ireland Economy and the Commonwealth Development Corporation.
 David Jon Gilmour, Songwriter, Guitarist and Singer. For services to Music.
 Charles Philip Graf, Lately Chief Executive, Trinity Mirror. For services to Regional Newspapers.
 Alan Thomas Grieve, Chairman, Jerwood Foundation. For services to the Arts.
 Eric Hagman, Chairman, Audit Committee, Scottish Enterprise. For services to Economic Development.
 Peter Hampson, QPM, Chief Constable, West Mercia Police. For services to the Police.
 William George Hastings, OBE, Chairman, Hastings Hotels Group. For services to the Northern Ireland Economy and the Hotel Sector.
 David Peter Hemery, MBE, Lately President UK Athletics. For services to Athletics.
 Pierre Francois Horsfall, OBE. For services to the community on Jersey.
 Howell Meirion Harris Hughes, Secretary to the Church Commissioners.
 Mrs Sandra Pauline Hunt, Assistant Chief Executive, London Borough of Newham. For services to Urban Regeneration in London.
 George Iacobescu, Chief Executive, Canary Wharf Group. For services to Regeneration and Inward Investment.
 Colin Ray Jackson, OBE, Athlete. For services to Sport.
 Terence Jagger, Director, Defence Evaluation Research Agency Partnering Team, Ministry of Defence.
 Gary Jones. For services to Emergency Nursing. 
 Anish Kapoor, Sculptor. For services to the Arts.
 Thomas Joseph Kavanagh, Secretary, Gaming Board for Great Britain.
 Simon John Keenlyside, Opera Singer. For services to Music.
 Dr Mary Paula Jane King Kilbane, Chief Executive, Eastern Health and Social Services Board. For services to Health Care in Northern Ireland.
 Professor Peter Thomas Kirstein. Professor of Computer Systems, University College London. For services to Internetworking Research.
 Miss Christine Knott, Chief Officer, Greater Manchester Probation Area. For services to the Probation Service.
 Professor Hermione Lee, Writer and Academic. For services to Literature.
 Miss Jennifer Lee Leggott, Director of Service Improvement, Planning and Nursing, Nottingham City Hospital. For services to Nursing and Midwifery.
 David Ian Lockwood, North West Area Manager, HM Prison Service, Home Office.
 John Christopher Lowry, Chairman, Standing Dental Advisory Committee. For services to Hospital Dental Surgery.
 Gerald Cyril Manning, OBE, Member, Environment Agency Board. For services to Flood Defence and to the Environment.
 David Arthur Ambler Marshall, Director General, Society of British Aerospace Companies. For services to Defence and Aerospace Industries.
 Professor Gordon Marshall, Lately Chief Executive, Economic and Social Research Council. For services to Economic and Social Research.
 Robert Crawford Martin. For public service. 
 Ms Judith McClure (Mrs Collins), Headteacher, St. George's School for Girls, Edinburgh. For services to Education in Scotland.
 Iain Macleod McMillan, Director, CBI Scotland. For services to Lifelong Learning.
 Deryk Mead, Chief Executive, National Children's Homes. For services to Children.
 Dr Dorothy Carnegie Moir, Director of Public Health, NHS Lanarkshire. For services to Public Health Medicine.
 James William Charles Moir, LVO, Controller, BBC Radio 2. For services to Broadcasting.
 Alfred Cosier Morris, DL, Vice-Chancellor, University of the West of England. For services to Higher Education.
 Elwyn Rhys Moseley, Commissioner, Commission for Local Administration in Wales. For services to Local Government.
 Neil Christopher Munro, Director, Revenue Policy, Inland Revenue.
 Mrs Bushra Khanum Nasir, Headteacher, Plashet School, Newham. For services to Education.
 Professor Linda Partridge, FRS, FRSE, Weldon Professor of Biometry, University College London, and President of the Genetics Society. For services to Evolutionary Biology.
 David Patterson, Founder and Emeritus President, Oxford Centre for Hebrew and Jewish Studies. For services to Jewish Studies.
 Howard Wesley Petch, OBE, Regional Co-ordinator, Farm Crisis Network, Yorkshire and Humber. For services to Farming and to Rural Communities in the East Riding of Yorkshire.
 Professor Colin Trevor Pillinger, FRS, Professor of Planetary Science, Open University. For services to Higher Education and to Science.
 Professor Robert Pratt, Professor of Nursing and Director, Richard Wells Research Centre. For services to Nurse Education.
 George Richard Profit, OBE, AFC. For services to Aviation Safety.
 Professor Christopher Graham Rapley, Director, British Antarctic Survey. For services to the Environmental Sciences.
 Ian William Reeves. For services to Business and the Tomorrow's People Trust.
 Brian Rigby. Lately Deputy Chief Executive, Office of Government Commerce, HM Treasury.
 Dickon Hugh Wheelwright Robinson, Director, Development and Planning, Peabody Trust. For services to Housing.
 Professor Martin Oliver Roland, Professor of General Practice and director of the National Primary Care Research and Development Centre, University of Manchester. For services to Medicine.
 Michael David Sherrard, QC, Director of Advocacy, Middle Temple, London. For services to the Legal Profession.
 Peter Anthony Smith, Lately General Secretary of the Association of Teachers and Lecturers. For services to Education.
 James Alexander Stephenson, Lately Chair, Advantage West Midlands. For services to Economic Regeneration, Partnership Working and Manufacturing in the West Midlands.
 Ian Stopps, Chief Executive, Lockheed Martin UK Ltd. For services to the Defence and Aerospace Industries.
 John Crispian Strachan, QPM, DL, Chief Constable, Northumbria Police. For services to the Police.
 Gordon Matthew Sumner, (Sting), Singer and Songwriter. For services to the Music Industry.
 Ms Marion Hooper Tait, (Mrs Morse) OBE, Ballet Mistress, Birmingham Royal Ballet. For services to Dance.
 Miss Sarah Ann Thane, Director of Programmes and Advertising, Independent Television Commission. For services to Broadcasting.
 Miss Yvonne Thompson, Managing Director, ASAP Communications Ltd. For services to Black and Ethnic Minority Business.
 The Rt Rev Anthony Michael Arnold Turnbull, Lately Bishop of Durham and formerly Bishop of Rochester. For services to the Governance of the Church of England and to Regional Affairs.
 Derek Turner, Lately Managing Director, Street Management, Transport for London. For services to Transport in London.
 Professor Gordon Alexander Bryce Waddell. For services to Social Policy and Disability Assessment.
 Ms Anne Margaret Watts, OBE. For services to Diversity.
 Adrian Spencer Vaughan Williams, Headteacher, Bury St. Edmunds County Upper School, Suffolk. For services to Education.
 Robert Barclay Woods, Group Managing Director, P&O Nedlloyd and President, Chamber of Shipping. For services to Shipping.
 Mrs Charmaine Carolyn Young. Regeneration Director, St. George, Berkeley Group. For services to Urban Regeneration.

Order of the British Empire (OBE)

Civilian Division
Maqsood Ahmed, Muslim Adviser, Home Office. 
Isadora Joye, Mrs. Aiken, D.L., Governor, Sheffield Hallam University. For services to Education and to the community.
Edgar William Allaway, Vice-President. For services to the Soldiers’, Sailors’ and Airmen's Families Association, Suffolk Branch.
Ms Sonita Alleyne, Director, Somethin’ Else Sound Directions Ltd. For services to Broadcasting.
Roger Townley Alston, Headteacher, William Howard School, Brampton, Cumbria. For services to Education.
Frederick Joseph Archer, lately Head, Efficiency and Consultancy Group, H.M. Prison Service, Home Office.
Catherine, Mrs. Baraniak. For services to Primary Care Nursing.
Dorcas Anne, Mrs. Batstone. For services to Gas and Electricity Customers.
Professor Robert Thompson Beaty, Chairman, Scottish Enterprise, Renfrewshire. For services to Enterprise.
David Robert Joseph Beckham. For services to Football.
Eric Gairdner Bell, Senior Partner, Grant Thornton, Belfast. For services to Commerce and Industry.
Gordon Bellard. For services to the Promotion of Nuclear Safety in the UK.
Mohamed Hanef Bhamjee, Founder, Wales Anti-Apartheid Movement. For services to Race Relations, the Wales Anti-Apartheid Movement and the charity and voluntary sector.
Major John David Blumsom, T.D., Chairman, Hertfordshire Committee. For services to the Army Benevolent Fund.
Professor Alan Raymond Boobis, lately Deputy Chairman, Advisory Committee on Pesticides. For services to the Risk Assessment of Pesticides.
Pek Lan, Mrs. Bower, Head, Library and Information Services, Department of Health.
Professor Dianna Joy Bowles, Weston Chair of Biochemistry, University of York. For services to Plant Sciences.
Peter Francis Boyle, County Director, BABC—Clubs for Young People. For services to Young People in Buckinghamshire.
Moira Jean, Mrs. Britton, Chief Executive, Tees and North East Yorkshire NHS Trust. For services to the NHS.
Stephen Gallagher Britton. Managing Director, Euro/ DPC, Llanberis, North Wales. For services to the Diagnostics Industry.
David Brook, Head, Planning Policy Branch for Land Stability, Flooding, Pollution Control and the Coastal Zone, OYce of the Deputy Prime Minister.
Dr. Richard Gordon McBride Budgett, Chief Medical Officer, British Olympic Association. For services to Sport.
Gordon Byrne, Director, Upper Bann Institute of Further and Higher Education, Banbridge, Co Down. For services to Further Education.
Miss Linda May Campbell, Chief Executive, United Kingdom Accreditation Service. For services to Accreditation.
Ian Gillett Carmichael, Actor. For services to Drama.
Andrew Nicholas Carter, Headteacher, South Farnham Community Junior School, Surrey. For services to Education.
Nigel Rodney Cartwright, Head of Branch and Principal Emergencies and Security Officer, Water Services, Department for Environment, Food and Rural Affairs.
John Lucius Arthur Cary, Chairman, Seed Capital Ltd. For services to Business.
Nemu Chandaria. For services to the Jain Community. 
Trevor Chandler, Head, Pen Green Early Excellence Centre, Corby, Northamptonshire. For services to Early Years Education.
Mohammed Akram Khan-Cheema, Consultant to the Association for Muslim Schools. For services to Education.
Bridget Katherine, Mrs. Cherry. For services to Architectural History.
David Clark, Senior Business Manager, Law Enforcement and Detection, H.M. Customs and Excise.
Edward James Clark, Prosecution Investigator, Inland Revenue.
John Neville Cohen, Head, Americas Section, Invest UK, Department of Trade and Industry.
Lieutenant Commander Ian Michael Patrick Coombes, R.N. (Retd.), Secretary and Treasurer. For services to the Association of Royal Navy Officers.
Ms Catherine Corcoran. For services to the Catholic Agency for Overseas Development.
Dr. Jacqueline Margery Mary Cornish, Paediatric Bone Marrow Transplant Physician, Bristol. For services to the National Health Service.
Dr. James Cox, General Medical Practitioner, Cumbria. For services to Medicine.
John Crossan, Principal, Mount Gilbert Community College, Belfast. For services to Education.
Dr. Robert Crouch, Consultant Nurse and Senior Lecturer, Emergency Department, Southampton General Hospital. For services to Nursing.
Ian Roy Cumming, Chief Executive, Morecambe Bay Hospitals NHS Trust. For services to the NHS.
David Innes Dalgetty, Team Leader, Finance and Central Services Department, Scottish Executive.
Peter William Daniels, Chief Executive, East Renfrewshire Council. For services to Local Government.
Ms Harriet Lydia Rose Llewellyn-Davies. For services to Housing and the Homeless in London.
The Reverend Dr. Noel Anthony Davies. For services Ecumenism in Wales.
Alan George Davis, Associate Partner, IBM (UK) Ltd. For services to the Ministry of Defence.
Raoul Frederick John de Vaux, J.P., Chairman, National Pubwatch. For services to the Licensed Trade.
William Anthony Doran, Managing Director, Construction Employers’ Federation. For services to Planning.
Tan Draig, Programme Manager, Q Arts. For services to Art.
Professor Douglas Eaglesham Dunn, Poet. For services to Literature.
Philip Dykins, Head of Branch, Transport Strategy Division, Department for Transport.
Ronald Eamonson. For services to the community, especially Regeneration and Business in Birmingham.
Ellen Margaret, Mrs. Eaton, Leader, City of Bradford Metropolitan District Council. For services to Local Government and to the community in Bradford.
Susan Kathleen, Mrs. Elworthy, Director of Nursing, North Glamorgan NHS Trust. For services to Nursing in Wales.
James Henry Robert Eyre, Architect and Director, Wilkinson Eyre Architects. For services to Architecture.
Peter Charles Fair, J.P., lately Lead OYcer for Northampton Schools Review. For services to Education.
David George Farrar. For services to Occupational Health.
Christine Mary, Mrs. Field, lately Chairman, Magistrates’ Association Family Proceedings Committee. For services to the Administration of Justice in London.
Anne, Mrs. Fine, Children's Laureate. For services to Literature.
Keith Antony Ford, Chief Executive, Mayday Healthcare NHS Trust. For services to the NHS.
Ms Beryl Foster. For services to Tackling Violence against Women.
Professor Brian Foster, Professor of Experimental Physics, University of Bristol. For services to Research on Particle Physics.
Ms Ann Freckleton, Policy and Strategy Adviser (Asia), Department for International Development.
Miss Elizabeth Jean Fulton, Chief Executive, BIH Housing Association. For services to Housing in Northern Ireland.
Alan Galley, Chief Executive Officer, Freightliner Ltd. For services to the Railway Industry.
Paul Winnett Gates, General Secretary, Knitwear, Footwear and Apparel Trades Union. For services to Industrial Relations in the UK Textiles Industry. *Colin Sidney George, Chair, Lifelong Learning Foundation. For services to Vocational Education and Human Resource Development.
Charlotte, Mrs. Gere. For services to Heritage, especially Decorative Arts and Jewellery.
Guy Edward Gibbons, Grade B1, Ministry of Defence. 
Anthony Alan Gibson, Regional Director, National Farmers’ Union. For services to Agriculture and the Rural Economy in the South West.
Jonathan Francesc Gili. For services to Broadcasting. 
Norman Neil Nicolson Gillies, Director, Sabhal Mor Ostaig. For services to Education and the Gaelic Language.
Keith Gledson. For public service.
Philip Ralph Golding. Headteacher, St Helen's Primary School, Ipswich, Suffolk. For services to Education.
Ms Christine Gowdridge, Director, Maternity Alliance. For services to Families.
Charles McKenzie Graham, lately Inspector, Occupational Health, Health and Safety Executive.
David Currie Grahame, Founder Director, LINC Scotland. For services to Entrepreneurship in Scotland.
Professor Alan John Gray, Director, Centre for Ecology and Hydrology Dorset Laboratory. For services to Government and Academic Science.
Alastair Keith Gray, Senior Research Officer, Veterinary Medicines Directorate, Department for Environment, Food and Rural Affairs.
David Gray, lately Head of Site, HRI East Malling and Wye. For Scientific and Technological services to the UK Horticulture Industry.
David Green, M.B.E., Director, Combined Heat and Power Association. For services to Energy Efficiency.
Hilary, Mrs. Grieve, lately Chair, Dumfries and Galloway Acute and Maternity Hospitals NHS Trust. For services to the NHS.
Loyd Daniel Gilman Grossman. For services to Patient Care, especially Hospital Catering.
Colin Watt Hague, Chief Test Pilot, Westland Helicopters. For services to Aviation.
Howard Michael Haslam, Chief Planning OYcer, South Norfolk Council. For services to the Planning Industry.
William Haughey, Executive Chairman, City Refrigeration. For services to Entrepreneurship in the West of Scotland.
Professor Alastair Watt MacIntyre Hay, Professor of Environmental Toxicology, University of Leeds. For services to Occupational Health.
Major Norman Edwin Hearson, J.P., D.L. For services to the community, especially the Hampshire Playing Fields Association and The Hampshire Technology Centre Trust Limited.
Miss Maureen Henderson, Executive Director, Nursing, South Glasgow University Hospitals Trust. For services to the NHS in Scotland.
The Very Reverend Dr. Michael John Higgins, Dean of Ely. For services to the Heritage of Ely Cathedral.
Robin Philip Coventry Higgs. For services to the Environment and Heritage in Surrey and Hampshire.
Julian Miles Holland (Jools Holland), Musician and Television Presenter. For services to the British Music Industry.
Andrew Myers Holroyd. For services to Publicly Funded Legal Services in Liverpool.
Beryl Edith, Mrs. Holt, Headteacher, Woodchurch High Specialist Engineering College, Wirral. For services to Education.
Stuart Housden, Director, Royal Society for the Protection of Birds, Scotland. For services to Nature Conservation in Scotland.
Barrie Hudson, Chief Executive, Forestry Contracting Association. For services to Forestry.
Norman William Hudson, Technical Adviser, Historic Houses Association. For services to the Heritage Tourism Industry.
John William Hughes, Chairman, Welsh Regional Flood Defence Committee. For services to Flood Defence in Wales.
Christopher George Wilson Hunter, Principal, Glasgow College of Nautical Studies. For services to Further Education in Scotland.
Ms Carol Isherwood, For services to Women's Rugby.
Miss Geraldine James, Actress. For services to Drama.
Ananda Jayatissa Jayasekera, Head, Sharp Programme, Licensing and Exploration Directorate, Department of Trade and Industry.
Elwyn Tudno Jones. For services to the community in Wales.
Gareth Jones, Director, Agricultural and Rural Affairs, National Assembly for Wales.
Miss Julia Peyton-Jones, Director, Serpentine Gallery. For services to Art.
Julie, Mrs. Jones, Director, Social and Community Services, Westminster City Council, London. For services to Social Care.
Thomas Jones, M.B.E., Industrial Relations Organiser, Transport and General Workers Union. For services to the Disadvantaged in Wales.
Professor James Roy Kearney, Honorary Professor of Voluntary Action Studies, University of Ulster. For services to the Voluntary Sector in Northern Ireland.
Ms Philippa Kennedy, Consultant Editor, The Press Gazette. For services to Journalism.
Ronald Critchley Kenyon. For services to the community, especially in Health and Education, in Nottingham.
Dr. Alison Margaret Kerr. Paediatric Neurologist specialising in Rett Syndrome. For services to Medicine.
Alan Edwin King. For services to the Church of England. 
Sir William Fettiplace Lawrence, Bt., Chairman, Heart of England Tourist Board. For services to the Tourist Industry.
Nigel Gilbert Lawrie, Headteacher, Port Glasgow High School. For services to Education.
Michael Jeffrey Leece, Chief Executive, National Marine Aquarium. For services to Tourism.
Charles Edward Lister. For services to the Safety of Blood and Blood Products, Department of Health.
Michael Raymond Lord, Executive Director, Sunjuice Ltd. For services to Industry in South Wales.
Philip Albert Lovegrove. For services to the Church of England.
Professor Philip David Lowe, Professor of Rural Economy and Founder of the Centre for Rural Economy at the University of Newcastle upon Tyne. For services to the Rural Economy.
Michael Joseph Lyons, Chair, West Yorkshire Passenger Transport Authority. For services to Public Transport.
Dennis Ivor Mabey, Member, Royal Institution of Chartered Surveyors, Rating and Local Taxation Policy Panel. For services to Public Valuation and Local Taxation.
Ms Elizabeth Anne MacLean, Chair, Albyn Housing Society Limited. For services to the community in the Scottish Highlands.
Iain MacLean MacSween. Chairman, Scottish Fishermen's Organisation. For services to the Fishing Industry.
Kathleen Maria, Mrs. Maguiness, lately Chair, Board of Management, Cardonald College, Glasgow. For services to Further Education.
The Venerable Ajahn Khemadhammo Mahathera, Spiritual Director of Angulimala. For services to Prisoners.
Don Manley, J.P. For services to the Administration of Justice in the West Midlands.
John Paul Marston, Sheriff's Officer. For services to High Court Enforcement.
The Reverend Canon Jeremy Fletcher Martineau, National Rural Officer, General Synod Board of Mission. For services to the Rural Communities.
Ingval Maxwell, Director, Technical Conservation, Research and Education Group, Historic Scotland. 
Michael McCabe, Director, Educational Services, South Ayrshire Council. For services to Education in South Ayrshire.
Carol, Mrs. McCletchie. For services to Tyne and Wear Employer Coalition and the New Deal.
Frederick James England McCrindle, Principal, Reading College and School of Arts and Design. For services to Further Education.
Alastair McGowan. For services to Accident and Emergency Medicine.
Fiona, Mrs. McMillan, Principal, Bridgwater College, Somerset. For services to Further Education.
Paul Francis McNamara, Director and Head of Research, Prudential Property Investment Managers Ltd. For services to the Property Industry.
Tanya Mary, Mrs. McWilliams. For public service. 
Professor Thomas Richard Miles. For services to People with Dyslexia.
Richard Mills, Secretary General, National Society for Clean Air. For services to the Improvement of Air Quality.
He ́le`ne Roberte, Mrs. Mitchell, Project Manager, Astronomy Project, National Maritime Museum. For services to Museum Education.
Jean Hamilton Susan, Mrs. Mitchell. For services to the HALO Trust.
Marlene Craigie, Mrs. Morley, Grade B1, Ministry of Defence.
Miss Anne Jessie Mackenzie Morris, lately Head, Fife Educational Service. For services to Children and Young People with Sensory Impairments.
Simon Morris, Principal Private Secretary to the Secretary of State for Wales.
Kitty, Mrs. Hart-Moxon. For services to Holocaust Training and Education.
Professor Elizabeth Murdoch, Emeritus Professor of Physical Education, Sports Science, Dance and Leisure, University of Brighton. For services to Physical Education and Sport.
Professor Norman Cummings Nevin, Chairman, Gene Therapy Advisory Committee. For services to Gene Therapy Research.
Janet Dianne, Mrs. Newton. For services to Education for Citizenship and the Teaching of Democracy in Schools.
Christopher James Nicol, District Manager, Jobcentre Plus, Department for Work and Pensions.
June, Mrs. Nisbet, Leader, School Government Team, School Admissions Organisation and Governance Division, Department for Education and Skills.
Miss Stella O’Brien, Head, Senior Staffing and Succession, Cabinet Office.
Miss Bernadette Ann O’Hare. For public service. 
William Edgar Oddie, Writer, Actor and Broadcaster. For services to Wildlife Conservation.
Ms Elsie Margaret Akva Owusu, Founder Member, Society of Black Architects. For services to Architecture.
Steve Packer, Deputy Director, Education for All Global Monitoring Report Team, Department for International Development.
Professor Godfrey Henry Oliver Palmer, Professor, Heriot-Watt University. For services to Grain Science.
Rosalie Parkinson, Grade B2, Ministry of Defence. 
Fraser Robertson Patrick, lately Director, Neighbourhood Resources and Development, Dundee. For services to Adult Education.
Joan, Mrs. Patten, lately Chair, South East England Tourist Board. For services to the Tourist Industry.
Paul Pegler, Leader, Facilities Contracts Management Team, H.M. Treasury.
Simon Pellew, Managing Director, PECAN. For services to Unemployed People and to the community in South London.
Dorothy Jean, Mrs. Penny, Associate Director of Redesign, NHS Modernisation Agency. For services to the NHS.
Elizabeth Mary Kirby, Mrs. Phillips, Headteacher, St. Marylebone Church of England School, Westminster, London. For services to Education.
Valerie, Mrs. Pitman. For services to the Duke of Edinburgh's Award Scheme in Northern Ireland.
Jonathan Alexander Skoyles Pritchard, lately Divisional Science and Strategy Director, QinetiQ. For services to the Defence Industry.
David Thomas Pugh, Secretary, Inter-Agency Committee on Marine Science and Technology. For services to Marine Sciences.
Brigadier Hugh Pye, Chairman, Cancer and Leukaemia in Childhood. For services to the community in the South West.
Margaret Pauline, Mrs. Quinn, Director of Midwifery, Blackburn, Hyndburn and Ribble Valley NHS Trust. For services to the NHS.
Professor Patrick Donald Rayfield, Professor of Russian and Georgian, Queen Mary (and Westfield College), University of London. For services to Slav Culture and Language.
Ms Jancis Mary Robinson, Writer and Broadcaster on Wine. For services to Broadcasting and Journalism.
Peter Richard Rogers, Editor, The Grower Magazine. For services to Horticultural Journalism.
Peter Rotheram. For services to Environmental Health. 
Ms Frances Ann Rumsey, Grade 7, Human Resources, The Pension Service, Department for Work and Pensions.
Thomas Walker Sale. For services to the community in Alnwick, Northumberland.
Frederick William Saunders, Chief Executive, East Staffordshire Borough Council. For services to Local Government in the West Midlands.
Mary Lynne, Mrs. Saunders, Headteacher, Bettridge School, Cheltenham, Gloucestershire. For services to Children with Special Educational Needs.
Ms Joanne Segars, Board Member, Occupational Pensions Regulatory Authority. For services to the Pensions Industry.
Colin Trevor Shaw, lately Chief Executive, Devon and Cornwall Housing Group. For services to Housing in Devon and Cornwall.
Stewart Anderson Sim, Operations Director, British Waterways. For services to Canals.
Brian Simpson. For services to the Development of Eurocode Design Standards.
Jagtar Singh, Deputy Chief Fire Officer, Bedfordshire Fire and Rescue Service. For services to Equal Opportunities in the Fire Service.
Marie, Mrs. Skinner, Farmer and Conservationist. For services to Rural Economy and to Farming in East Anglia.
Jane, Mrs. Smart, Executive Director, Plantlife International. For services to the Conservation of Wild Plants.
Rodney Brian Hedley-Smith. For services to the Corporation of London.
Sarabjeet Singh Soar. For services to Small Business in the West Midlands.
Geoffrey Howard Sole, lately Senior Principal Surveyor, Lloyd's Register of Shipping. For services to Shipping.
David Hunter Sparks, Member, Dudley Metropolitan Borough Council and Local Government Association. For services to Local Government.
John Squires, D.L. For services to the community, especially the Tyne and Wear Foundation in the North East.
Richard John Sterling, Managing Director, Coolkeeragh Group Ltd. For services to the Basic Skills Committee and Business in Northern Ireland.
Alec James Stewart, M.B.E. For services to Cricket.
David Stewart, Headteacher, Shepherd Special School, Nottingham. For services to Education.
Stephen Stewart, Chief Executive, Coventry and Warwickshire Connexions Partnership. For services to Young People.
Philip Street, Chief Executive Officer, Community Education Development Centre. For services to Community Education in the West Midlands.
Paul Richard Streets, Chief Executive, Diabetes UK. For services to People with Diabetes.
Professor Hugh Brown Sutherland, lately Honorary Adviser on Graduate Relations. For services to the University of Glasgow.
David Ronald Swallow, Headteacher, Barry Comprehensive School, Vale of Glamorgan. For services to Education.
Gerald Sweeney, Contact Centre Manager, East Kilbride, Inland Revenue.
David Whitlock Tanner, Performance Director, Amateur Rowing Association. For services to Rowing.
Ms Kathleen Tattersall, Director General, Assessment and Qualifications Alliance. For services to Education.
Robin Harry Teague, Consultant Gastroenterologist, South Devon Healthcare Trust. For services to Medicine.
Kenneth Olumuyiwa Tharp, Artistic Director, National Youth Dance Trust. For services to Dance.
Edward John Thomas, lately Acting Chief Executive, Bro Taf Health Authority. For services to the NHS.
Lilian Doris, Mrs. Thompson, M.B.E., J.P., Chairman, Blackpool Pleasure Beach Ltd. For services to the community in Blackpool, Lancashire.
Caroline, Mrs. Thomson, Chairman, Highland NHS Board. For services to the NHS in Scotland.
Hugh Gilmour Thomson, Director, Research and Consultancy Services, University of Strathclyde. For services to the Commercialisation of University Research.
Glenys, Mrs. Timmons, Assistant Director, OYce of Science and Technology, Department of Trade and Industry.
Dr. Gladys Mary Tinker, lately Consultant, Care of the Elderly, Cardiff and Vale NHS Trust. For services to the NHS.
Ms Jennifer Mary Topper, Artistic Director, Hampstead Theatre. For services to Drama.
Martin Turrell, Head of Branch, Judicial, Civil and Family Business Solutions, E-Delivery Group, Lord Chancellor's Department.
Jef Aartse Tuyn, Head, Countryside Communications, Royal Agricultural Society of England. For services to the Royal Agricultural Society of England.
Campbell Wilson Tweed, lately Chairman, Historic Monuments Council. For services to Historic Monuments Protection in Northern Ireland.
Jhalman Singh Uppal, Chairman, Punjabi Culture Society and District Councillor, Telford and Wrekin. For services to Community Relations in Telford and Wrekin.
Ms Dorma Jane Urwin, lately Principal, University College, Worcester. For services to Higher Education.
Jack Vettriano, Artist. For services to the Visual Arts.
Michael J. Viney. For services to UK Exports.
Arnold Wagner, Chair of Governors, JFS School, Brent, London. For services to Education.
Roy Belford Walker, Principal Child Care Manager. For services to Young People in the East Riding of Yorkshire.
Sandra Ann, Mrs. Walton, Headteacher, Allens Croft Primary School, Birmingham. For services to Education.
Alexander Bell Watson, Chief Executive, Angus Council. For services to Local Government.
John White, Director, Group Technology, Royal Bank of Scotland. For services to the Banking Industry in Scotland.
Bernard Whiting, Business Change Manager, Inland Revenue.
John Spencer Wilkinson, lately Grade B2, Ministry of Defence.
Bryan Peter Williams, Professor of Social Work, University of Dundee. For services to Social Work Education and Training.
Ashley John Graham Winter, Chairman, Learning and Skills Council for Tyne and Wear. For services to Business in the North East.
Roger Wood, Head, Data Quality Branch, Food Standards Agency.
Kui Man Yeung, Director, Yang Sing Group. For services to Business in Manchester.

Diplomatic Service and Overseas
Dr. Bruce Arnold. For services to journalism and UK-Irish relations.
James Jose-Maria Arroyo. First Secretary, Foreign and Commonwealth Office.
Richard Patrick Faithorn Barber. For services to international trade.
David Murray Blake. For services to the India OYce Records.
Rex Brown. For services to UK commercial interests in the Middle East.
Edmund George Capon. For services to the promotion of British art in Australia.
Piers William Alexander Cazalet, lately First Secretary, Foreign and Commonwealth OYce.
Ms Anna Louise Clunes. First Secretary, UK Mission to the United Nations, New York.
James Atchison Cogan, Founder and Director of Students Partnership Worldwide.
Nancy, Mrs. Dargel. For services to Oxford University and the British community in Switzerland.
Paul Dugan. For services to British business interests and the British community in Saudi Arabia.
Michael John Elliott. For services to British journalism in the USA.
David George Glasgow. For services to British commercial interests in Poland.
Alastair Hay
Manzoor Hasan, lately Executive Director, Transparency International Bangladesh.
Rosemary Eileen, Mrs. Hilhorst, Director, Connecting Futures project, British Council.
Susan Elizabeth, Mrs. Hogwood, M.B.E., H.M. Ambassador, Kigali.
Eric Jenkinson, lately First Secretary, British Embassy Tehran.
David Nigel Kay. For services to British business interests and the British community in the USA.
Lee Kirkham. For services to Save the Children in Africa.
Ms Alison Lane. For services to disadvantaged children in Mexico.
Kevin David Lewis, lately Director Bulgaria, British Council.
Peter Baron Maynard. For services to the British and local communities in Ecuador.
James Forbes McCulloch. For services to British exports.
Professor David Paul Mellor. For services to British scholarship schemes overseas.
Edris, Mrs. O’Neal. For services to the community, British Virgin Islands.
Eric Albert Pearse Hughes. For services to UK-Mexican cultural relations and to the British community in Mexico.
Richard Fowler Pelly. For services to the Budapest Festival Orchestra and to the British community in Hungary.
Ms Emma Playfair, lately Executive Director Interights. For services to the promotion of human rights.
Dr. Harry Lindsay Potter, DfID Natural Resources and Rural Livelihoods Adviser, Malawi.
David Elliott Ritch, J.P. For public service, Cayman Islands.
Michael Richard Rogers. For services to the British community and charities in Switzerland.
Krishna Savjani, Honorary British Consul, Blantyre and Honorary Legal Adviser to the British High Commission Lilongwe.
Nickleby Robin Duncan Tait. For services to British business interests in Australia.
Ms Kristin Scott Thomas. For services to acting and to UK-French cultural relations.
Linton Nathaniel Tibbetts. For services to the community, Cayman Islands.
Commander John Martin Williamson Topp, Royal Navy (Retired). For services to the environment and conservation in the British Indian Ocean Territory.
Graham Beverley Tullet. For services to ex-servicemen and to the British community in India.
David Douglas Willey, BBC Correspondent, Rome. 
Alma, Mrs. Williams, lately member of the UK delegation to the European Economic and Social Committee.
Mark Adrian Wilson, Honorary British Consul, Bali. For services to the victims of the Bali bombing.
Philip John Wilson, Assistant to the Honorary British Consul, Bali. For services to victims of the Bali bombing.
Ms Belinda Anne Irene Wright. For services to the protection of wildlife and endangered species in India.

Member of the British Empire (MBE)

Civilian Division
Neil Adam, Janitor, Friockheim Primary School, Angus. For services to Education and to the community in Friockheim, Angus.
Rosemary Annette, Mrs. Adams. For services to Libraries in Northern Ireland.
Roy Adams. For services to the community in Londonderry.
Isa, Mrs. Allan, Tea Lady. For services to Scottish Enterprise.
Marie, Mrs. Allen, Head, The Fresh Start Faculty, Liverpool Community College. For services to Basic Skills Provision.
Rosalind Clare, Mrs. Allsopp, Grade E1, Ministry of Defence.
John Anderson. For services to Animal Health. Thomas Fraser Bews Anderson. For services to the community in Stromness, Orkney.
Harry Ashley Andrews, J.P., Councillor, Caerphilly County Borough Council. For services to the community in Bargoed, South Wales.
Francis Houlston Annett, Education Research Manager, Learning and Skills Council. For services to Training and Education in the North East.
Ivor Alan Appleton, Retained Firefighter. For services to the community in Waltham, Grimsby.
James Whiteford Arbuckle, J.P., Immediate Past Chairman, Royal Northern Countryside Initiative. For services to Agriculture and Rural Education.
Robert Armstrong, Secretary and Founder Member, Abbey Historical Society. For services to Cultural Heritage in Northern Ireland.
Keith Douglas Arnold, Design and Prepress Manager, Ordnance Survey, Office of the Deputy Prime Minister.
Ms Stacey Atkinson. For services to Children with Learning Disabilities.
Ms Irene Audain, Chief Executive, Scottish Out of School Care Network. For services to Out of School Care Services in Scotland.
Jacqueline Dorothy, Mrs. Austin, Clinical Nurse Specialist, Nevill Hall Hospital, Abergavenny. For services to Cardiac Rehabilitation.
Margaret Ann, Mrs. Backhouse. For services to the community, especially Health and Elderly People in Warwickshire.
Malcolm Alan James Baker. For services to the community in Kidlington, Oxfordshire.
George Gerald Edward Baldry. For services to the community in Merseyside.
David Delius Anton Bantock. For services to the community, especially Education in Withywood, Bristol.
Diana Elizabeth, Mrs. Barber. For services to the community, especially the League of Friends of Pembury Hospital, Kent, and the Osteopathic Centre for Children.
Stuart Barber. For services to the community, especially the Waterloo Legal Advice Service, South London.
Jennifer Christine, Mrs. Barnes. For services to Wells Cathedral Catering Ltd in Somerset.
Kathleen Anne, Mrs. Barnett. For services to the Citizens’ Advice Bureau and to the community, South Somerset.
Ann, Mrs. Bartleet. For services to the Council for the Protection of Rural England.
Adolphus Leslie Bateson. For services to Elderly People in Somerset.
Mark Grahame Batten. For services to the community, especially the Centre ’70 Community Association, Lambeth, South London.
John Edgar Beach. For services to Music.
Doreen, Mrs. Beardall. For services to Ruddington Framework Knitters Museum, Nottingham.
Joseph Beattie, ChauVeur. For services to the Confederation of British Industry.
Denise Sharon, Mrs. Bedford, Youth Worker, Kirklees Youth Services. For services to Young People in West Yorkshire.
Miss Riaz Begum, Youth Worker, Asian Heritage Young People, Blackburn. For services to Young People.
Ann, Mrs. Bell, Fishing Industry Co-ordinator, Aberdeenshire Council. For services to the Fishing Industry.
Brian Wallace Bell, Grade C1, Ministry of Defence. 
Joyce, Mrs. Bellamy. For services to Garden History. 
Ms Vivienne Jane Bennett, lately Project Director, Imperial War Museum North, Manchester. For services to Museums.
James Gordon Bennison. For services to Basketball. 
Christine, Mrs. Bentley, Matron, Queen Elizabeth The Queen Mother Hospital, Kent. For services to the NHS.
Linda Jean, Mrs. Berwick. For services to People with Disabilities, especially the Lin Berwick Trust, Sudbury, Suffolk.
David Michael Bills. For services to the National Trust and to the community in Kinver, West Midlands.
Elizabeth Margaret, Mrs. Bishop. For services to the community in Tonyrefail, South Wales.
Sehdev Parshad Bismal. For services to Community Relations in Wolverhampton.
Ms Helen Black. For services to the Broadcasting and Creative Industries Disability Network (BCIDN).
Robert Gillon Watson Black, Chairman, Caravan Club. For services to Caravaning and Tourism.
Katharine Vera, Mrs. Bligh, lately Archivist, House of Lords.
Alec Bloom, Chairman, Hospital Heartbeat Appeal. For services to People with Heart Disease.
David Alexander Bolton, Director, Primary Care and Community Services Development, Lothian Primary Care Trust. For services to Health Care in Scotland. *David Bone. For services to the Boys’ Brigade Bandwork in Scotland.
Margaret, Mrs. Bone. For services to the Royal British Legion, Buckinghamshire.
Alice, Mrs. Booth, Member, Wales Parish Council. For services to the community in Rotherham, South Yorkshire.
Miss Gillian Booth, Administrator, Competition Commission.
Norman William Booth. For services to Sport in Redbridge and Essex.
Thomas Edward Bourne, Environment Director, Welsh Development Agency. For services to Sustainable Development in South Wales.
Ann, Mrs. Bowker. For services to Tourism in Cumbria. Victor Frederick Bowsher. For voluntary services to the community in East Devon.
James McCall Boyd, lately Provost, East Ayrshire Council. For services to Local Government and to the community.
Trevor Dempster Boyd. For services to Meteorology. 
David Richard James Boyton, lately Human Resources Adviser, H.M. Prison Belmarsh, H.M. Prison Service, Home Office.
Rodney Winston Brache. For services to People with Disabilities in Guernsey.
Patricia Mary, Mrs. Bradbury, J.P. For services to the Board of Visitors, H.M.Prison Blakenhurst, Redditch, Worcestershire.
Geoffrey Braithwaite. For services to the community in Clitheroe and the Ribble Valley, Lancashire.
Edward Francis Leopold Brech, Honorary Research Fellow, Management History Research Group, Open University Business School. For services to the History of British Management.
Sydney Brewin. For services to the Citizens’ Advice Bureau, East Sussex.
Helen Jennetta Adam, Mrs. Brewster. For services to the community in Dundee.
John Stewart Briggs. For services to the Sea Cadet Corps, Keighley, West Yorkshire.
John Christopher Brindle, Managing Director, J. Fishwick & Sons Ltd. For services to the Bus Industry.
Henry Brisbane, Chairman, Shopmobility Scotland. For services to People with Disabilities in Scotland.
Jean, Mrs. Britton, Day Hospital Manager, Walton Hospital, Chesterfield.
Professor Alan John Brook. For services to the community, especially Music and Education in Buckinghamshire.
Gary Brooker, Musician. For charitable services. 
Antony Charles Barrington-Brown. For services to Heritage and to the community in Codford, Wiltshire.
Errol Brown, Singer. For services to Popular Music. 
George Herbert Brown, Chair of Governors, Oxhey First School and Kingsfield School, Stoke-on-Trent. For services to Education.
Hamish Brown, Detective Inspector, Metropolitan Police. For service to the Victims of Harassment. 
Kenneth Brown, Business Manager, Medical Benefits Section, International Pension Centre, Department for Work and Pensions.
Miss Deirdre Brownsell, Executive Officer, Department for Work and Pensions.
Miss Gladys Bryan. For services to the National Children’s Homes and to the community of Upholland, Lancashire.
Neil Anthony Buckley, Senior Teacher, Mathematics, Guthlaxton College, Leicestershire and Public Examiner, Assessment and Qualifications Alliance. For services to Education.
Edward Alfred John Bull. For services to Maidstone Mediation.
John Bulleyment, lately Sergeant, British Transport Police.
John Spencer Burnett, Chairman, Board of Management, Oatridge Agricultural College. For services to Further Education in Scotland.
Brian Gordon Burns, Strategic Manager, Mail and Distribution, Inland Revenue.
Glenise Irene, Mrs. Burns, lately Scheme Manager, Methodist Homes Housing Association. For services to Sheltered Housing, Arbroath.
Mervyn Burtch, President, KidsOp. For services to Music and Education in Wales.
Samuel Butler. For services to the Industrial Development Board, Northern Ireland.
Joseph Calzaghe. For services to Boxing.
Isabel, Mrs. Campbell, Founder, Belles Organising and Secretarial Services. For services to Enterprise in Lochaber.
Jane Elizabeth, Mrs. Cannon. For services to Business and Engineering.
Dr. William Hugh Carling, President and Founder, Cardiac Rehabilitation and Support Group, Fareham, Hampshire. For services to Cardiac Patients.
Michael Carney. For services to Amateur Boxing. 
Christopher Brian Carr. For services to the community in Dorking, Surrey.
The Reverend Philip John Carrington, Hospital Chaplain, South Tees Hospitals NHS Trust.
Annie Clelland, Mrs. Carson. For public service. Sandra Margaret, Mrs. Carter. For services to the Unemployed Voluntary Action Fund, Scotland.
Adrienne Dianne, Mrs. Catherwood, D.L. For services to Action Research in Northern Ireland.
Vera Eliza, Mrs. Catton, Chair, Cancer Research Campaign, Wandsworth and District Branch, London.
Jean Thompson, Mrs. Caulfield, Beaver Scout Leader. For services to the community, Castlerock, County Londonderry.
Betty, Mrs. Challis, School Crossing Warden, Witchford, Ely.
Gopal Chandra. For services to Community Relations in Birmingham.
Philip Alexander Chapman, Constable, Lincolnshire Police. For services to the Police and to the community in Alford, Lincolnshire.
Miss Gillian Patricia Cheeseman, President of the Secretaries’ and Assistants’ Council, House of Commons.
David Charles John Christie. For services to the Historic Environment and to the community of Hampstead, London.
David Robert Church. For services to the Royal Mail and to the Scouting Movement in Norwich.
Penelope, Mrs. Clarke, Senior Renal Care Assistant, Oxford RadcliVe Hospitals NHS Trust. For services to the NHS.
Ruth, Mrs. Clarke, Honorary Secretary. For services to the RNLI, Colchester.
Miss Mary Terez Clifford, Nurse Manager and Clinical Nurse Specialist, Rheumatology Unit, Musgrave Park Hospital, Belfast. For services to Nursing.
Martin John Coates. For services to Young People in Seaforth, Merseyside.
Miss Heather Ann Cole, Administrative Officer, New Deal Lone Parent Advisers, Department for Work and Pensions.
Peter McMurray-Cole, Chairman, Gainsborough Decorations Ltd. For services to Charity, especially Health in Wales.
Anita, Mrs. Collier, Project Manager, Sheffield Action Team, Department for Work and Pensions.
Richard Francis Constantine, lately Coxswain/ Mechanic. For services to the RNLI, Scarborough.
Harry Cook, President, Labrador Rescue Society. For services to Dog Welfare.
Malcolm Coombs, Grade D, Ministry of Defence.
Peter Thomas Cornwell, Administrative Officer, Department for Work and Pensions.
Andrew Shaun Cousins, Assurance Officer, H.M. Customs and Excise.
Gordon Cowan, J.P. For services to the community, especially to Young People in Sale, Cheshire.
Miss Janet Rosemary Cox. For services to the Macmillan Cancer Relief Fund.
William Ramage Cox, Member, Claythorn Community Council. For services to the community in Claythorn, Glasgow.
Mollie, Mrs. Craig. For services to Erskine Hospital for Ex-Service Men and Women in Scotland.
Patricia, Mrs. Creighton, Chair, Executive Committee, Croydon Voluntary Youth Sector. For services to Young People.
Miss Margaret Rose Cresci, Head, Mental Health Nursing, Pontypridd and Rhondda NHS Trust. For services to Mental Health Nursing.
William Edward Cromar, Secretary, National Fire Services Benevolent Fund. For services to Fire OYcers and their Families.
Miss Ruth Iris Cronin, Administrative Officer, Jobcentre Plus, Department for Work and Pensions.
Robert Johnstone Crosbie. For services to the Corporation of London.
Ms Dianne Crowe, Specialist Gynaecology Nurse, Hexham General Hospital, Northumberland. For services to Women’s Health.
Julie, Mrs. Crowson. For services to the community in Skegness and Wainfleet.
John James Cubby, lately Chief Wildlife Ranger, Forestry Commission.
Mervyn Albert Dane, Journalist, The Impartial Reporter, Enniskillen. For services to Journalism.
Miss Elizabeth Margaret Davidson, Personal Secretary, Inland Revenue.
Karen, Mrs. Davies, Chief Executive, Heart of England Fine Foods Group Ltd. For services to the Promotion of Regional Food.
Richard Donald Davies, Archivist of the Russian Archive, Brotherton Library, University of Leeds. For services to Anglo-Russian Scholarship.
Alison Apphia, Mrs. Denham-Davis. For services to the community, especially the Citizens’ Advice Bureau in Cirencester, Gloucestershire.
Carol, Mrs. Davis, Caretaker and Support Assistant, Bulphan Primary School, Thurrock, Essex. For services to Education.
Margaret, Mrs. Deeney, Scheme Co-ordinator, Oaklee Housing Association Limited. For services to Elderly People in Northern Ireland.
Sydney Devine, Singer. For services to Entertainment in Scotland.
Anne Alexandra, Mrs. Dey, lately Receptionist, Environment and Rural AVairs Department, Scottish Executive.
Anne, Mrs. Diss, D.L. For services to the community, especially Community Action Furness, Barrow-in- Furness, Cumbria.
Nora, Mrs. Dixon. For services to the community in Poulshot, Wiltshire.
Christina Magdalena, Mrs. Dodd, Constable, West Mercia Constabulary. For services to the Police and to the community in Worcester.
Fiona Bisset, Mrs. Dodds. For services to Homeless People and to the Citizens’ Advice Bureau, Hamilton.
Ann, Mrs. Dowell, Enquiry Clerk, Avon and Somerset Constabulary. For services to the Police.
John Drew, lately Brigade Procurement Officer, Wiltshire Fire Brigade. For services to the Fire Service.
Edmund Ernest Ivor Drury. For services to the Royal Mail and to the community in Craigavon, Northern Ireland.
Paul Erskine Dunn, Sergeant, Metropolitan Police. For services to the Police.
Michael John Dunning, Head, Technical and Craft Training, AWE plc. For services to the Defence Industry.
Iris, Mrs. Dunstan. For services to the community, especially the Pony Club and the RNLI, Cornwall.
Charles Albert Dupont. For services to the Alderney Breakwater.
Gilbert Ainslie Dures. For services to Older People in Bury, Lancashire.
Simon Maxim Dyson. For services to Charity, especially to the Anthony Nolan Bone Marrow Trust.
Elizabeth Jane, Mrs. Earle, Chair, School Friends Association and Governor, Roos Primary School, East Riding of Yorkshire. For services to Education.
Jean Marie, Mrs. Eburne, President, Girlguiding, South West England. For services to Young People. 
Anthony John Edwards, Lloyds/TSB Retired Staff Liaison Officer. For services to Occupational Pensioners.
Michael John Eke. For services to the community, especially to Young People in March, Cambridgeshire.
Rahimah, Mrs. Elaheebucus, Range 8, Public Understanding of Science Team, Office of Science and Technology, Department of Trade and Industry.
Frederick Joseph Elliott. For services to the Sea Cadet Corps, Scotland.
Paul Marcellus Elliott. For services to Football and Community Relations in South East London.
Brian Ellison, Assessment, Research and Educational Programme Manager, Mobility Advice and Vehicle Information Service, Department for Transport.
Richard Elsey. For services to the community in Fotheringhay, Peterborough.
Rebecca Desiree, Mrs. Elsy, J.P. For services to the Citizens’ Advice Bureau and to the community, South Tyneside.
David Rowan Elwell, Communications Officer, Essex County Fire and Rescue Service. For services to the Fire Service.
David Stuart English. For services to Charity.
Clare Jennifer, Mrs. Evans. For services to the Wiltshire and Swindon Users’ Network and Disabled People. 
Miss Lynn Evans. For services to the Law Centres Federation, London.
Richard George Evans, Deputy Headteacher, Copland Community School, Wembley, London. For services to Education.
Joan, Mrs. Everard. For services to the Soldiers’, Sailors’ and Airmen’s Families Association, Barrow-in-Furness.
Dreda Annette, Mrs. Farmer, Grade C2, Ministry of Defence.
Jennifer, Mrs. Farr, D.L. For services to the NSPCC in Nottingham.
Linda, Mrs. Faulkner, Reception and Security Manager, Facilities Management London, Commercial Services Division, Department for Education and Skills.
James Fawcett, J.P. For services to the community and to the Licensed Taxi Trade in Newcastle-upon-Tyne.
Piers William Trahern Feilden, Member, WaterVoice Wessex Committee. For services to Water Industry Customers.
Peter Alexander Fell, Policy Adviser, Family Policy Division, Lord Chancellor’s Department.
Albert Fellowes. For services to the community, especially Young People, in Rainhill, Merseyside.
Kenneth Charles Fenton, Chairman, Welshpool and Llanfair Light Railway. For services to Tourism and to the community in Mid Wales.
John Humphries Ferguson, Citybus Driver. For services to Transport in Northern Ireland.
Aubrey Dukes Fielding. Campanologist and Ringing Master, St. Columb’s Cathedral, Londonderry. For services to Bell Ringing.
Donald Joseph Filliston, Chairman, Sandgate Conservation Society. For services to Conservation, Storrington, West Sussex.
Trevor John Fisher, Process Compliance Manager, United Utilities. For services to the Water Industry and to the community in the North West.
Miss Mehru Fitter, Manager, Multicultural Library Services, Coventry. For services to the community.
Houston Fleming, Chairman, Dykebar Hospital Patients’ Council, Renfrewshire. For services to Mental Health.
Peter John Fletcher, Governor, Bideford College, Devon. For services to Education.
William Robert Forde, Leading Chargehand Examiner, Ministry of Defence.
Daphne Mary, Mrs. Foulsham, Vice President, National Gardens Scheme. For services to Charity.
Gordon James Fowlie. For services to the community, especially Agriculture in Lewes, East Sussex.
Douglas George Friend. Principal Officer, H.M. Young Offender Institution and Remand Centre Glen Parva, Home Office.
Robert Francis Friend. For services to Broadcasting.
Gwendolyn Dorothy Margaret, Mrs. Frost, Tailor to the Armed Forces.
Susan Christine, Mrs. Fuller. For services to Science.
Margaret Mary, Mrs. Gammon. For services to the community in Woking, Surrey.
Barbara Dunbar, Mrs. Gartside. For services to the WRVS and to the community in Surrey.
Alan Gear, Chief Executive, Henry Doubleday Research Association. For services to the Development of Organic Horticulture.
Jacqueline, Mrs. Gear, Executive Director, Henry Doubleday Research Association. For services to the Development of Organic Horticulture.
Peter Gibbons, Information Communication Technology Technician, Philips High School, Manchester. For services to Education.
Heather, Mrs. Gibbs. For services to the community in Hampton, Middlesex.
Dr. Angus Alexander Mackintosh Gibson, Chairman, Scottish Cot Death Trust. For services to Health.
Sheila Anne, Mrs. Giles, Caseworker, Inland Revenue. 
Jean Mercedes, Mrs. Gooding, Governor, Haling Manor High School and Howard Primary School, Croydon, Surrey. For services to Education.
Walter John Martin Gosling, Senior Probation OYcer. For services to the Probation and Prison Services in Norfolk.
Bankim Chand Gossai. For services to Community Relations in South London.
Jacqueline Ann, Mrs. Gough, Business Development Manager, Jobcentre Plus, Dudley, Department for Work and Pensions.
Carolyne Isabelle, Mrs. Graham, Special Needs Educational Clerical Auxiliary, Lanark Grammar School. For services to Education.
Hugh Scoolar Grant. For services to the Maintenance of Denmore Park, Aberdeen.
Margaret Winifred, Mrs. Grant. For services to Nature Conservation, Stanford in the Vale, Oxfordshire.
Belissa Mary Hunter, Mrs. Graves. For services to the community in East Bergholt, SuVolk.
Eveline Ann, Mrs. Gray, Senior Dental Hygienist Tutor. For services to Dental Hygiene in Scotland.
Miss Sally Jean Gray, Millennium Volunteers Ambassador. For services to Young People.
Ronald Desmond Gregg. For services to the community in Belfast.
Lyndsay Nairn Grewar. For services to Scouting in Kirriemuir, Angus.
Joseph Paul Gribbon, Buildings OYcer, St. Bartholomew’s and the Royal London School of Medicine and Dentistry. For services to Higher Education.
John Arthur Grimwood. For services to the community, especially the Petworth Town Band in West Sussex.
Ernest Stillfried Guild, Director, British Wheelchair Athletics Association. For services to Disabled Sports.
Ian Arthur Gunning, Constable, North Wales Police. For services to the Police.
Miss Dorothy Mary Hadingham, Leader, Disabled Rangers Guides Trefoil Guild. For services to Disabled People in Croydon and District.
Alice Marjorie, Mrs. Hale. For services to the community in Carshalton, Surrey.
Rex David Hall, Education Consultant. For services to Study Support and Playing for Success.
Richard John Hallam, Head, Music Service, Oxfordshire County Council and Chair, National Association of Music Educators. For services to Music Education.
Sarah, Mrs. Hammonds. For services to the community, especially to St. Bartholomew’s Church, Blurton, Stoke-on-Trent.
David Hanrahan, Complaints Manager, Inland Revenue.
Eileen Barbara, Mrs. Hargreaves, Chair of Governors, Beauherne Community School, Canterbury, Kent. For services to Education.
Dennis Harper. For services to the community, especially Young People in Bridlington, East Riding of Yorkshire.
Frank Harper. For services to RAF Historical Research. 
Rex Arthur Harper, Voluntary Worker, RSPCA. For services to Wildlife in Cornwall.
David John Harrigan, First Line Manager, Devonport Management Ltd. For services to the Defence Industry.
Jacqueline, Mrs. Harris. For services to Housing and Regeneration in Bow, London.
Derek Harrison, Branch Secretary, National Association of Retired Police Officers, Durham. For services to the Police.
Barrie John Hartley, Senior Professional Technology OYcer, Policing and Crime Reduction Group, Home OYce.
David John Hastings. For services to the community, especially Heritage in Norfolk.
Ellen Margaret, Mrs. Hawkins, Grade E1, Ministry of Defence.
Peter Philip Hawkins, Business Support Auditor, NAAFI. For services to the Ministry of Defence.
Margaret, Mrs. Hayes. For services to the community, especially in the Belle Isle North Estate, Leeds.
Rosemary Rebecca, Mrs. Hayes, J.P., Councillor, Pembrokeshire County Council. For services to the community in Pembrokeshire.
Shirley, Mrs. Hayward, Head of School for Skills for Life and Learning, Yeovil College, Somerset. For services to Basic Skills.
Gordon Stirling Henderson, Secretary, Scottish Outward Bound Association. For services to Young People.
David Barclay Hilton. For services to the Earl Haig Fund.
Jean Lesley, Mrs. Hinchliffe. For services to the community in Huddersfield, West Yorkshire.
Norman Hilton Holland, Chairman, Business Link Berkshire and Wiltshire. For services to the Small Business Community.
David Holt, Production Supervisor, BAE Systems. For services to the Defence Industry.
Jane, Mrs. Hook, Chair, Scottish Society for Autism. For services to those affected by Autism.
Paul James Hooley, J.P. For services to the community in Bedford.
Susan Elizabeth, Mrs. Hooper. For services to the community in Saltash, Cornwall.
June Audrey, Mrs. Hope. For services to Oxfam in Berkhamsted, Hertfordshire.
Frederick Godfrey Howard, Head, Shellfish Hygiene Group, Fisheries Research Services, Marine Laboratory, Aberdeen.
Ms Margaret Howell, Founder, Southend Women’s Refuge. For services to Tackling Violence against Women.
John Rhys Howells, Senior Explosives Ordnance Detection Adviser, Thames Valley Police. For services to the Police.
Michael John Hoy. For services to Education and to the Arts in the Isle of Man.
Anthony Bruce Edward Hudson. For services to the Falkland Islands Memorial Chapel, Pangbourne, Berkshire.
John Spencer Hudson, Chair, Partney and Dalby Parish Council. For Services to the community in Spilsby, Lincolnshire.
Miss Glenys Hopwood Hughes. For services to the British Red Cross Society in Flintshire.
Miss Patricia Ann Hughes. For services to People with Disabilities in North Wales.
Ms Carrie Humble, Founder and Director, Thoroughbred Rehabilitation Centre. For services to Racehorse Welfare.
Kenneth Ernest Humphrey, Project Director, Mornington Community Project. For services to the community in Belfast.
Isabelle, Mrs. Hunter. For services to Young People in Ballynahinch, County Down.
Yvonne Suzanne, Mrs. Huntriss. For services to the community, especially Bloxham Village Museum, Banbury, Oxfordshire.
Hasanat Mohammad Husain. For services to Community Relations in East London and to the Education of Ethnic Minority Communities.
Shafaquat Hussain, Co-ordinator, Khushi Project. For services to the Asian Community in the West Midlands.
Shelim Hussain, Chairman and Managing Director, Eurofoods Ltd. For services to Business in Wales.
Brian Hutchinson, Business Development Manager, The Prince’s Trust, East Midlands. For services to Young People.
Peter William Hutley. For services to the community in Surrey.
Ms Gloria Hyatt, Principal, Elimu Academy, Toxteth, Merseyside. For services to Education.
Patricia, Mrs. Hyman. For services to the Citizens’ Advice Bureau, Aldershot, Hampshire.
Bruno Imerini, Security Supervisor, OFSTED Headquarters. For services to Education.
William John Jack. For public service.
Miss Barbara Amy Bridget Jackson. For services to Ladies’ Golf.
David John Jackson. For services to H.M. Coastguard, Cornwall.
Harry Raymond Jackson. For services to the community, especially Sport in Humbleton, East Riding of Yorkshire.
Rose, Mrs. Jackson, Founder Member, Gateway Club, Hessle, East Riding of Yorkshire. For services to Special Educational Needs.
Caroline, Mrs. James, Staff Nurse, Frenchay Hospital, Bristol. For services to Nursing.
Gwynedd Talfryn James. For services to Agriculture and to the Environment in South West Wales.
John Peter Compton James, lately Chairman, Kennel Club. For services to the World of Dogs.
Dr. William Robert Jenkinson, Director, Occupational Health and Safety, Bombadier Aerospace—Shorts Group. For services to Health and Safety in Northern Ireland.
Mary, Mrs. Jenner, J.P. For services to Health and the community in Weybridge, Surrey.
Robert Samuel Jennings, Principal, Slemish College, Ballymena, Co. Antrim. For services to Education.
Miss Denise Ann John, Administrative Officer, Jobcentre Plus, Department for Work and Pensions.
George Edward Johns. For services to Fostering, Devon.
Gillian, Mrs. Johns. For services to Fostering, Devon. 
George Herbert William Johnson. For services to the community of Colwyn Bay and Conwy.
Stanley James Johnson. For services to Heritage and Tourism in North Yorkshire.
Michael Darius Bedford Leno Jonas. For services to Nature Conservation in Hertfordshire.
Anne Frances, Mrs. Jones, Member, Mid Sussex District Council. For services to the community in Burgess Hill.
David Jones. For services to Local Government and to the community in Denbigh, North Wales.
The Reverend Edward Gwynfai Jones, lately Minister, St. Rollox Parish Church, Sighthill, Glasgow. For services to Race and Community Relations and Asylum Seekers.
Elspeth Mary Margretta, Mrs. Jones. For services to Race and Community Relations and Asylum Seekers in Sighthill, Glasgow.
Jeffrey Jones. For services to the community in Bridgend, South Wales.
Joy, Mrs. Jones, Leader, Westbury Park Playgroup, Bristol. For services to Pre-School Education.
William Randle Jones, Honorary Adviser, Duke of Edinburgh’s Award Scheme. For services to Young People in the West Midlands.
Ian Paul Jordan, Emergency Planning and Community Safety Manager, Dumfries and Galloway Council. For services to Emergency Planning.
Janet May, Mrs. Keel, lately Grade D, Ministry of Defence.
Margaret Mary, Mrs. Kelly. For services to Crime Concern and the Youth Justice System.
Robert Derek Kelsey, Chairman, UYngton White Horse Show. For services to Tourism in UYngton, Oxfordshire.
Om Prakash Khanna, Chief Executive, Ethnic Minority Enterprise Centre, Glasgow. For services to Ethnic Minority Communities.
Margaret Spreull, Mrs. Kinninmonth. For services to Guiding and to the Kirkcaldy Canoe Club, Fife.
Miss Dorothy Kinrade, Business Impact and Measure Manager, H.M. Customs and Excise.
Malcolm Carl Kleiman, Proprietor, Fairway School of Motoring. For services to People with Disabilities in Yorkshire.
Charles Douglas Knott, lately Chief Commandant, Northumbria Police. For services to the Police.
Stewart Lambie, Chairman, Arran Mountain Rescue Team. For services to Mountain Rescue.
Frank Langford. For services to the community in Walsall, West Midlands.
Olive, Mrs. Langford. For services to the community in Walsall, West Midlands.
Joyce Ethel, Mrs. Langley. For services to the community in Lockleaze, Bristol.
Hamilton Irvine Lavery, Transport Development Manager, Translink. For services to Transport in Northern Ireland.
Arthur Abraham Lawson. For services to the Association of Jewish Ex-Servicemen and Women.
Peter Foden Lee. For services to the community, especially Business in Brixworth, Northampton.
Francis du Heaume Le Gresley. For services to the community in Jersey.
Kenneth George Leggett. For services to Agriculture in Norfolk.
Karel Lek. For charitable services to the NHS in North Wales.
Elsie Mary, Mrs. Lewis, Union OYcial, National Union of Agricultural and Allied Workers. For services to the Agricultural Community.
John Richard Lewis, Chair of Governors, Lamphey Primary School, Pembrokeshire. For services to Education.
Margaret, Mrs. Lewis, lately Support Services Manager, South Pembrokeshire Hospital. For services to the NHS.
Michael Stuart Limbrey, Chairman, Montgomery Waterway Restoration Trust. For services to Inland Waterways.
Brian William Limbrick, Founder, Hitchin British Schools Project and Trust. For services to the History of Elementary Education.
Gwynedd, Mrs. Lingard. For services to Gymnastics especially for Children with Special Needs.
Sheila Jane, Mrs. Lloyd. For services to International Aid in Africa.
Joyce Lillan, Mrs. Long. For charitable services to Southend Hospital NHS Trust.
Catherine, Mrs. Love. For services to Guiding in Renfrewshire.
Reginald Frank Lovelock, District Councillor, South Kesteven. For services to Local Government and to the community in Lincolnshire.
Angus Stewart Lowden, Area Resource Manager, Meat Hygiene Service, Food Standards Agency.
Ada Doreen, Mrs. Lowe. For services to the WRVS in Liverpool.
David Holden Luscombe, Member, Birmingham City Council. For services to Local Government.
John Laird Thomas Luscombe, Electrical Fitter, Devonport Management Ltd. For services to the Shipbuilding Industry.
Eleanor May, Mrs. Lyall. For services to Scouting in Scotland and to the Linn Moor Residential School.
Miss Kathleen Rose Lynch. For services to Garden History.
Thomas Williamson Mabbott, Secretary, Royal Caledonian Horticultural Society. For services to Horticulture in Scotland.
Dr. Sheena Lindsay MacDonald, Chair, Borders Local Health Co-operative, Berwickshire. For services to Medicine.
John MacInnes, Area Assessor, Crofters Commission, Ross of Mull and Iona, Argyll. For services to Crofting.
Desmond Gordon MacKey. For public service.
Group Captain Alison Margaret MacKintosh, RAF (Rtd). For services to the RAF Benevolent Fund in Fife.
Roderick John MacLeod, Piper. For services to Piping. 
Jeffrey Maddock, Managing Director, Simbec Research Ltd., Merthyr Tydfil. For services to Clinical Research in South Wales.
Miss Debra Magill, Personal Secretary, H.M. Prison Liverpool, H.M. Prison Service, Home Office. For services to the Prison Service Charity Fund. *Rosemary, Mrs. Majer, lately Business Support Manager, Corporate Development Group, Cabinet Office.
Ms Emma Mandley, lately Director, Regional Affairs, London Weekend Television. For services to Broadcasting.
Marjorie, Mrs. Manton, B.E.M. For services to the WRVS and to the community in Horsham, West Sussex.
Victor Charles John Marchant, Archaeologist. For services to Archaeology.
Gerard Marsden, Entertainer. For services to Charity in Merseyside.
Valerie, Mrs. Marsden, Senior Personal Secretary, Health and Safety Executive.
Blanche Ellen Maggie Kirby, Mrs. Marsh. For services to the community in Somerset.
Balraj Krishan Marwaha. For services to the Asian community in Scotland.
Beryl, Mrs. Mason. For services to Sure Start, Early Years Education and Childcare, Telford, Shropshire.
Naheed, Mrs. Arshad-Mather, J.P., Deputy Chair, Unity Housing Association. For services to the community in West Yorkshire.
Richard Crichton Matthew, Chief OYcer, Merchant Navy Training Board. For services to the Shipping Industry.
Mary, Mrs. Matthews. For services to Archery.
Roger Bayley Maxwell. For public service.
Thomas Maybin. For services to the community in Larne, County Antrim.
Ronald Sidney McCall. For services to the Royal Air Force Association, Bedfordshire.
Jean, Mrs. McCambley. For services to Young People in Belfast.
Dorothy Muriel, Mrs. McCann. For services to the Citizens’ Advice Bureau, Birkenhead, Wirral.
William Andrew McConnell. For public service. 
Anthony Peter McCoy, Jockey. For services to Horseracing.
Mavis, Mrs. McCune. For services to Young People in Belfast.
Gary McLaughlin. For services to Young People in Downpatrick, County Down.
Malcolm Murdo McLean. For services to the community in Berneray, Isle of Lewis.
Ann, Mrs. McMaster. For services to the Victims of Domestic Violence through the East Durham Women’s Refuge and East Durham Domestic Violence Forum.
Angela, Mrs. McMullen. For services to People with Disabilities in Cambridgeshire
Steven Mellers, Founder and Manager, Fairbridge Centre, Kent. For services to Young People.
William Campbell Melville. For public service. 
Henrietta, Mrs. Menice. For services to Housing in Northern Ireland.
Ms Valerie Metcalf. For services to Equal Opportunities.
John Pollard Metcalfe, lately Chairman, Central Borders Branch, Multiple Sclerosis Society.
Iona, Mrs. Meyer. For public service.
Bambul Miah. For services to the community in the West Midlands.
Mohammad Arju Miah. For services to community relations in Swindon, Wiltshire.
Miss Lorraine Michaels. For services to Unemployed People in Merseyside.
David Miller, Chairman of Governors, Wimbledon School of Art. For services to Higher Education.
Lucy, Mrs. Miller. For services to the Girls’ Brigade in Cumbernauld.
Uttambhai Dahya Mistry, J.P. For services to the community in Bolton.
Mary, Mrs. Mitchell, Home Help. For services to the services to Archaeology. community in Banbridge, Co Down.
Miss Patricia Ann Moir, Nurse, Accident and Emergency Department, Royal Aberdeen Children’s Hospital. For services to Families in Grampian.
Miss Isobel Montgomery, Senior Clerical Assistant, James Hamilton Academy, Kilmarnock. For services to Education.
Ronnie Moodley, Chief Executive, ARHAG Housing Association. For services to Refugees.
Annie Allan Stevenson, Mrs. Mooney. For services to the community in Stirling.
Ronald David Moore, Court Manager, Canterbury Combined Court Centre, Court Service, Lord Chancellor’s Department.
Catherine Denise, Mrs. Morgan, Headteacher, Goetre Infants School, Merthyr Tydfil. For services to Education.
Daniel Edward Morgan, J.P. For services to the Administration of Justice in Herefordshire.
David Treharne Morgan, T.D. For services to Transport Preservation in the UK and Europe.
June, Mrs. Morrell, Administrative OYcer, West London County Court, Court Service, Lord Chancellor’s Department.
Elizabeth Pearl, Mrs. Morrison, Curriculum Director, Fermanagh College. For services to Further Education.
Thomas Hulme Moss. For services to Dance in Wigan, Lancashire.
Ellen, Mrs. Mulvey. For services to Ex-Service Personnel in Broughton House Home, Salford.
Mary Bernadette, Mrs. Munden (Mrs. Gilbert), Nursery Nurse, Claremont School, Bristol. For services to Special Needs Education.
Barbara Margaret, Mrs. Murray. For services to the Women’s Royal Voluntary Service in Fort Augustus.
Robert Jack Nelson. For services to Unemployed People in the East Midlands.
David Newbigging, Rehabilitation Instructor, State Hospital, Carstairs. For services to Patient Therapy.
Patricia, Mrs. Newman, Youth Worker, Youth and Community Education Service. For services to Young People in Walsall, West Midlands.
Reginald Nicholas. For services to People with Disabilities in Cornwall.
William James Nicholl. For public service.
Alan Nicolson. For services to the community in Banffshire.
Lawrence Michael Nippers. For services to Local Government in Wales.
Cyril Charles Norman, lately Parish Clerk. For services to Local Government in Eastham, Worcestershire.
John Michael Nugent. For services to Education, Skills and Business in Greater Manchester.
Margaret Mavis, Mrs. Nutter. For services to the community, especially the Springhall Hospice Charity Shop, Rochdale, Lancashire.
Helen, Mrs. Ogborn. For services to the Victim Support Scheme, Tameside.
Jamie Trevor Oliver, TV Chef and Restaurateur. For services to the Hospitality Industry.
Patrick John Ormonde. For services to Amateur Theatre.
Malcolm Douglas Osmundson, School Resource Manager, School of Biomedical Sciences, King’s College, London. For services to Higher Education.
Rhoda, Mrs. Ottoway. For services to Ridge Meadow Primary School, Chatham, Kent. For services to Education.
Hazel Ann, Mrs. Oughton, School Crossing Warden. For services to the community in Frodsham, Cheshire. 
Victoria, Mrs. Ouzman, Senior Personal Secretary, Police Complaints Authority, Home Office.
Cecile, Mrs. Oxaal, English Teacher, Winifred Holtby School, Hull. For services to Education.
Linda Anne, Mrs. Paice, Complaints Co-ordinator, Broadcasting Standards Commission.
Iris Mona, Mrs. Pain, Typist, Employment Tribunals Service, Department of Trade and Industry.
Angela, Mrs. Palmer, Nursery Nurse, Northfield Road Primary School, Dudley, West Midlands. For services to Education.
Marilyn Peggy, Mrs. Palmer, Manager, International Trade Services, Bristol Chamber of Commerce and Initiative. For services to International Trade.
Phyllis Ann, Mrs. Palmer, Founder Member, South Cumbria Dyslexia Association. For services to Special Needs Education in Cumbria.
Keith Pape, Constable, West Yorkshire Police. For services to the Police.
Michael John Millard Parker, T.D., Emergency Planning Adviser, Severn Trent Water. For services to the Water Industry.
Gordon John Parris, J.P. For charitable services, Surrey. Betty Joan, Mrs. Patchett. For services to Skipton Hospitals’ League of Friends.
Wendy, Mrs. Paterson, Development Officer, South East Scotland Training Consortium. For services to Social Work in Scotland.
Dr. Binay Kumar Pathak, General Medical Practitioner, Nottingham. For services to Primary Health Care.
David Anthony Pearman. For services to the Conservation of British Flora and to the Botanical Society of the British Isles.
Marion, Mrs. Pearson, Head of Finance, Glasgow Film Theatre. For services to the Cinema.
Eleanor, Mrs. Perkins. For services to the Soldiers’, Sailors’ and Airmen’s Families Association, Bristol.
Graham Alan Perry, Founder Member, Great Western Society. For services to Railway Heritage.
Ms Sharon Peters, Team Leader, FCH Housing and Care. For services to Housing in the West Midlands.
Lawrence Erling Petterson. For services to Charity especially Health in South Wales.
John Philcox, Head of Personnel, Engineering and Physical Sciences Research Council.
Alan Phillips. For services to charity in Jersey.
The Venerable Galayaye Piyadassi. For services to Community Relations in North London.
Stuart James Pizzey, Constable, Greater Manchester Police. For services to the Police and to the community.
William Alfred Place, Messenger, Government Office for Yorkshire and Humber.
Keith Andrew Player, Grade C1, Ministry of Defence. 
Vera Kenton, Mrs. Plummer. For services to the WRVS and to the community in East London.
Annabelle Elizabeth, Mrs. Poots, Founder Member, Lisburn Special Care School Parents’ Association. For services to the community in Lisburn, Co Antrim.
Edward George William Powell, Station Honorary Secretary. For services to the RNLI, Barry, South Glamorgan.
Michael William Powley. For services to Supported Employment in the South West.
Christine Joyce, Mrs. Price. For services to International Development.
Maureen, Mrs. Pritchard, Cleaner. For services to the Royal Institution of Chartered Surveyors.
John Alan Prodger. For services to the community in Buckinghamshire.
Peter Joseph Prunty, Force Commandant, Cleveland Special Constabulary. For services to the Police.
Angelina, Mrs. Purcell. For services to Business Development and International Trade in South London.
Stella Rosamond, Mrs. Pye, Personal Assistant to the Vice Chancellor, University of East Anglia. For services to Higher Education.
Steve Pyke, Photographer. For services to the Arts. 
Raymond Paul Quant. For services to the community in Borth, Ceredigion.
Robin Radley. For services to the NSPCC and to the Treloar Trust in Hampshire.
Eric James Rainey, lately National Trust Area Warden. For services to the Conservation of Wildlife in Strangford Lough, Northern Ireland.
Mehmet Ramadan, lately Lift Attendant, Palace of Westminster.
Catherine Quinn Katie, Mrs. Ramage, Director, Community Involvement Ltd, Larkhall. For services to People with Special Needs in Lanarkshire.
Peter Rana. For services to Business and International Trade.
Graeme Donald Randall. For services to Judo.
Robert Eric Michael Randall. For services to Karate. 
Richard Nisbet Earle Raven. For services to the community in Shrewsbury, Shropshire.
Peter Raymond, Non-Executive Chairman, Tepnel Life Sciences. For services to the UK Bioscience Sector.
Violet Margarethe Alice, Mrs. Reader. For services to the community in Sutton, Norfolk.
Janet, Mrs. Reynolds, Managing Director, Octavius Hunt Ltd. For services to International Trade.
Joan, Mrs. Reynolds. For services to the community in South East Wales.
Maurice Edward Reynolds. For services to People with Learning Difficulties and Prader-Willi Syndrome.
Peter Robert Richardson, Teacher, Haycliffe Special School, Bradford. For services to Special Needs Education.
Eileen, Mrs. Riddick, Management Secretary, Scottish Prison Service.
Major Peter Harold Ridlington. For services to the Gurkha Welfare Trust.
Nicholas Riley. For services to UK Geosciences. 
Mohummad Risaluddin. For services to Interfaith Relations.
Cecil Ritchie. For services to Road Safety.
Glynn Morton Roberts, Head, Birmingham Outdoor Education Centre, Birmingham City Council.
Marian, Mrs. Roberts, Councillor. For services to the community in Blaenau Gwent, South Wales.
Robert Sommerville Robertson, Driver, Fleet Support Ltd. For services to the Defence Industry.
Andrew John Robinson, Head, Community Development Banking, NatWest and Royal Bank of Scotland. For services to Social and Community Enterprise.
Martin Joseph Roddy, Constable, Gloucestershire Constabulary. For services to the Police.
Alexander Philip Roe, Constable, West Midlands Police. For services to the Police and to Charity.
Jean Valentine, Mrs. Rogers. For services to the WRVS in Dorset.
Audrey Watkin, Mrs. Rose. For services to the community, especially Health and Education in Sheffield.
Elvina Sheila, Mrs. Russell, Chairman, Pembrokeshire Community Health Council. For services to Health.
Philip Ralph Hugh Russell, B.E.M., Grade C2, Ministry of Defence.
Philip Sackett, lately Clerk, Minster Parish Council. For services to the community in Minster, Thanet, Kent.
Miss Dora Mary Sales. For services to the community in Usk, Monmouthshire.
Dilip Sarkar. For services to Aviation History. 
Yvonne Janet, Mrs. Saunders, Divisional Administration Officer, Hampshire Constabulary. For services to the Police.
Alan Samuel Schwartz, Member, Welsh Interfaith Council and Board of Deputies of British Jews. For services to Interfaith Relations and to the Jewish Community in Wales.
James Scott. For services to the community and to the Royal Mail, Bracknell, Berkshire.
Dr. Matta Venkataramanaiah Shathrughna Setty, General Medical Practitioner, Ashford, Kent. For services to Primary Health Care.
Kathryn, Mrs. Severn. For services to the community in Llanfairpwll, Anglesey.
Eric James Seymour. For services to the Royal British Legion in Essex.
Robina Shahnaz Shah, J.P. For services to Asian Children with Learning Disabilities.
Samir Sharma. For services to Community Relations in Scotland.
Doreen Elizabeth, Mrs. Sharpe. For public service. 
Judith Craig, Mrs. Shedden, Co-Founder, Grown Up Congenital Heart Patients Association. For services to People with Congenital Heart Disease.
Imelda, Mrs. Shelley, Research Information Officer, Wales Tourist Board. For services to Tourism.
Peter Edwin Sillibourne. For services to Ruckinge and Hamstreet Scout and Guide Associations, Kent. 
Tennakoon Mudilige Dayananda Silva, Civil Engineer. For services to Public Transport in London.
Marion, Mrs. Simon, J.P. For services to Trade Unions and Workplace Learning Services, Yorkshire and Humberside.
Pamela, Mrs. Simpson. For services to the Citizens’ Advice Bureau, Richmond, Surrey.
John Roger Sims, Secretary, League of Friends, Royal Orthopaedic Hospital, Birmingham. For services to Health.
Amolak Singh, Chief Executive, Dental Practitioners’ Association. For services to Dentistry.
Simon Singh. For services to the Promotion of Science, Technology, Engineering and Maths in Schools and to Science Communication.
Sylvia, Mrs. Sklayne. For services to the community in Redbridge, Essex.
Daphne Mary Walker, Mrs. Sleigh, lately Councillor, City of Edinburgh Council. For services to Local Government and to the community.
Thomas Kay Slimming, Lecturer, Stow College, Glasgow. For services to Special Needs Further Education.
Robert William Sly, New Deal Co-ordinator and Operations Manager, Dorset, Department for Work and Pensions.
Alan John Smith, Licensing Officer, Environment Agency. For services to Water Resource Management.
Barry Lewis Smith, Recovery Manager and Deputy Unit Head, Inland Revenue.
Christine Annette, Mrs. Smith. For services to the community, especially to Music in Nottingham.
Eileen Annie Elizabeth, Mrs. Smith. For services to the Sea Cadet Corps, Southampton.
Gillian Elizabeth, Mrs. Smith. For services to Community Safety.
Ian Monro Smith, Inspector, Invercannie Water Treatment Works. For services to the Scottish Water Industry.
Malcolm Smith. For services to the Board of Visitors, H.M. Prison Lancaster.
Martin Ansdell-Smith, Senior Network Analyst, Information Services Division, Department for Education and Skills.
Robert William Smith. For services to Community Safety.
Terence Henry Rosslyn Smith. For services to Disadvantaged People.
Alan John Spedding, Director of Music, Beverley Minster. For services to Music.
Judith, Mrs. Spicer, Pensions Team Leader, Department for Work and Pensions.
Penny, Mrs. Spink. For services to British Fencing.
Brian Francis Squires. For services to the community in Linton, Herefordshire.
Richard Charles Squires, D.L. For services to the community, especially conservation in Wantage, Oxfordshire.
John Malcolm Stansfield. For services to Agriculture and to the community in Reading.
Barry Steed. For services to the community in Bournemouth and Poole, Dorset.
Sheila, Mrs. Steele, J.P. For services to Girlguiding UK and to the community in Stoke-on-Trent, Staffordshire.
Dr. David Brook Stevens. For services to Motor Sport Medicine in the Isle of Man.
Alfred Davison Stewart, Biomedical Scientist Manager, Belfast Link Laboratories. For services to the Laboratory Service.
Joyce, Mrs. Stewart, lately Director of Horticulture, Royal Horticultural Society. For services to Horticultural Science and Botanical Education. 
Robert Watt Stewart, Manager, Jobcentre Plus, Department for Work and Pensions.
John David Stockport, Constable, North Yorkshire Police. For services to the Police.
Cyril David Stockwell, Member, Sparsholt Parish Council and Member, Royal Institution of Chartered Surveyors. For services to Local Government in Sparsholt, Hampshire.
Diane Maureen, Mrs. Stone, Co-ordinator, Community Action Centre, University of the West of England. For services to Higher Education.
Patricia, Mrs. Stringfellow, Chair, Judging Panel, National Training Awards. For services to Training. 
Carole Hester, Mrs. Sturgess. For services to Mental Health Care in Swansea.
Mohammed Ali Syed. For services to Community Relations in South West London.
Abu Taher. For services to Community Relations in the Midlands.
Michael Tangye. For services to Heritage in Cornwall.
Roger John Radcliffe Tanner, D.L. For services to the Arts in Saddleworth, Oldham.
Brian Taylor, Secretary, Open Door Project, Redbridge, Essex. For services to Young People.
Charles Edward Taylor, Town Councillor, Presteigne and Norton Town Council. For services to the community in Presteigne, Powys.
Charles Harry Taylor, T.D. For services to the community, especially the Trinity Centre in Winchester, Hampshire.
Miss Jacqueline Taylor. For services to the community of Saltburn-by-the-Sea, Yorkshire.
Jean, Mrs. Tennant. For services to Marie Curie Cancer Care.
Alfred Keith Dyson Terry. For services to Tramways and Tramcar Heritage.
Giles Eric Tewkesbury. For services to Young People. 
Jayprakash Thakkar, Facilities Officer, H.M. Customs and Excise.
Angela, Mrs. Thomas. For services to Elderly People with Disabilities in Desford, Leicestershire.
Carmen Teresa, Mrs. Thomas, Youth Leader, Kingsteignton Youth Centre, Devon. For services to Young People.
George James Thomas. For services to the Royal Mail and to the community in Shrewsbury.
Joyce Helen, Mrs. Thomas. For services to the community in Ross-on-Wye, Herefordshire.
Andrew Edward Thompson. For services to the community in Bangor, Co Down.
Anne, Mrs. Thompson, Principal, Currie Primary School, Belfast. For services to Education.
Miss Diane Hilary Thompson, Personal Assistant to Chairman and Chief Executive, Alvis plc. For services to the Defence Industry.
Henry Andrew Thompson. For services to the community in Coleraine, Co Londonderry.
Janice Ann, Mrs. Thompson, Regional Co-ordinator, Investors in People, Inland Revenue.
Kenneth Clive Thomson. For services to the British Red Cross Society in Orkney.
Terry Timlett. For services to the community in Devon.
Elizabeth, Mrs. Toman. For services to Social Welfare in Northern Ireland.
Jane Emily, Mrs. Tomlinson. For charitable services in West Yorkshire.
James Alan Tompkins, lately Premises Manager, Langbourne Primary School, Southwark, London. For services to Education.
William Ian Tootell. For services to the Romanian Childline.
Cyril Trust. For services to the community in Farnham, Surrey.
Mary Ruth, Mrs. Tucker, Adult Education Tutor, Neath. For services to Lifelong Learning.
John Turley. For services to Life Saving in Lanarkshire.
Barbara, Mrs. Turnbull. For services to the Citizens’ Advice Bureau, Clackmannanshire.
Elsie Ellen, Mrs. Tytherleigh. For services to the WRVS in Essex.
Romesh Vaitilingam. For services to Economic and Social Science.
Kenneth Venables, Community Safety Manager, Basildon District Council. For services to the Police and to the community.
Miss Diane Wadsworth, Manager. For services to London Underground.
Paul Gerald Wagstaff, Principal Lecturer, Aeronautics, Kingston University. For services to Higher Education.
Suzanne Frances, Mrs. Walsh. For services to the Homeless in Blackpool.
Suzanne, Mrs. Warn, Public Examiner, Geography for Edexcel. For services to Education.
Timothy John Wass, RSPCA Superintendent, East Anglia. For services to Animal Health and Welfare.
Joseph Callander Watson. For services to the community, especially the Willow Burn Hospice in Lanchester, County Durham.
John Blakeney Waugh, Principal, Wheatfield Primary School, Belfast. For services to Education.
Jack Webber. For services to the National Trust.
Allan Andre Wells, Joiner, Ministry of Defence.
Miss Kathleen Rita Welsh. For services to People with Disabilities in Scotland.
David West, lately Education and Training Adviser, Scottish Engineering. For services to the Engineering Industry in Scotland.
Ron West, Technical Manager, Environment Agency. For services to the Environment.
Ms Sally Margaret West. For services to Age Concern.
Helen, Mrs. White, School Crossing Warden, Christchurch, Dorset.
Nicholas Charles Whitney, Head, Technical Support, Westland Helicopters. For services to the Aviation Industry.
Ian Whittingham. For services to Health and Safety in the Construction Industry.
Thomas John Whyatt, Managing Director, Continental Teves UK Ltd, Ebbw Vale. For services to Industry in Wales.
Clare, Mrs. Wichbold, Local Government Officer. For services to Rural Herefordshire.
Helen Irvine Adair, Mrs. Wickens, Constable, Norfolk Constabulary. For services to the Police.
Pauline Rosemary, Mrs. Wilkinson. For services to the community in Chesham, Buckinghamshire.
Mary Yvonne, Mrs. Williams, Grade D, Ministry of Defence.
Margaret Mary, Mrs. Williamson. For services to the community in Congleton, Cheshire.
Bernice Joan, Mrs. Willis, Leader, Oswestry Borough Council and Chairman, Memorial Hall Trust. For services to the community in Oswestry, Shropshire.
Joyce, Mrs. Willis, Teaching Assistant, Willoughby School, Bourne, Lincolnshire. For services to Special Education Needs.
Alwyn Peter Wilson. For public service.
Frank Robert George Wilson, Boys’ Brigade Leader. For services to Young People in Sunderland.
John Douglas Wilson. For services to Beekeeping. 
Margaret, Mrs. Wilson. For services to Young People and to the community in Edinburgh.
Patricia June, Mrs. Wilson, Waste Technical Officer, Environment Agency. For service to Waste Management.
Ronald David Wilson. For services to the Far East Prisoners of War Association.
William John Connor Wilson, Director, Technical Services, Belfast Harbour Commissioners. For services to the Port Industry.
Eric Gordon Winterflood. For services to Conservation and to the community in Cambridge.
Zbigniew Wojcik, Racial Equality OYcer, Derby Racial Equality Council. For services to the New Deal.
Danny Wai-Ching Wong, Chair, Chinese Welfare Association and Chamber of Commerce. For services to the Chinese Community in Northern Ireland.
Raymond Wong. For services to Community Relations in Bristol.
Bryen Norman David Wood, Honorary Curator, Bushey Museum and Art Gallery. For services to Heritage.
Joanna, Mrs. Woodd. For services to Victims of Crime in Lambeth, London.
Stephanie Janice, Mrs. Woodruff. For services to British Exports.
Alan Wright, Mechanical Fitter, Thames Water. For services to the Water Industry.
Peter Andrew Thomson Wright. For services to The Duke of Edinburgh’s Award Scheme in Edinburgh and Lothian.
Anne Monica Gordon, Mrs. Wyburd. For services to the Criminal Justice System in Hertfordshire.
Margaret Doreen, Mrs. Wylde. For services to Amateur Operatic Societies in Farnham, Surrey.
Jacqueline, Mrs. Yong, Typist, Jobcentre Plus, Department for Work and Pensions.
Maureen, Mrs. Young. For services to Save the Children in Berkshire.

New Zealand

References

Birthday Honours
2003 awards
2003 awards in the United Kingdom